

477001–477100 

|-bgcolor=#E9E9E9
| 477001 ||  || — || December 30, 2008 || Kitt Peak || Spacewatch || EUN || align=right | 1.3 km || 
|-id=002 bgcolor=#E9E9E9
| 477002 ||  || — || December 31, 2008 || Kitt Peak || Spacewatch || — || align=right | 1.3 km || 
|-id=003 bgcolor=#E9E9E9
| 477003 ||  || — || December 31, 2008 || Kitt Peak || Spacewatch || — || align=right | 1.7 km || 
|-id=004 bgcolor=#E9E9E9
| 477004 ||  || — || December 29, 2008 || Kitt Peak || Spacewatch || — || align=right | 2.9 km || 
|-id=005 bgcolor=#E9E9E9
| 477005 ||  || — || December 29, 2008 || Kitt Peak || Spacewatch || — || align=right | 1.8 km || 
|-id=006 bgcolor=#E9E9E9
| 477006 ||  || — || December 30, 2008 || Kitt Peak || Spacewatch || — || align=right | 1.3 km || 
|-id=007 bgcolor=#E9E9E9
| 477007 ||  || — || December 30, 2008 || Kitt Peak || Spacewatch || — || align=right | 1.8 km || 
|-id=008 bgcolor=#E9E9E9
| 477008 ||  || — || October 30, 2008 || Mount Lemmon || Mount Lemmon Survey || — || align=right | 1.4 km || 
|-id=009 bgcolor=#E9E9E9
| 477009 ||  || — || December 22, 2008 || Kitt Peak || Spacewatch || NEM || align=right | 1.8 km || 
|-id=010 bgcolor=#E9E9E9
| 477010 ||  || — || December 30, 2008 || Kitt Peak || Spacewatch || — || align=right | 1.4 km || 
|-id=011 bgcolor=#E9E9E9
| 477011 ||  || — || December 21, 2008 || Kitt Peak || Spacewatch || — || align=right | 1.4 km || 
|-id=012 bgcolor=#E9E9E9
| 477012 ||  || — || December 22, 2008 || Kitt Peak || Spacewatch || — || align=right | 1.3 km || 
|-id=013 bgcolor=#E9E9E9
| 477013 ||  || — || November 20, 2008 || Mount Lemmon || Mount Lemmon Survey || — || align=right | 1.2 km || 
|-id=014 bgcolor=#E9E9E9
| 477014 ||  || — || December 22, 2008 || Mount Lemmon || Mount Lemmon Survey ||  || align=right | 2.9 km || 
|-id=015 bgcolor=#E9E9E9
| 477015 ||  || — || December 30, 2008 || Kitt Peak || Spacewatch || — || align=right | 1.7 km || 
|-id=016 bgcolor=#E9E9E9
| 477016 ||  || — || December 22, 2008 || Mount Lemmon || Mount Lemmon Survey || HOF || align=right | 2.2 km || 
|-id=017 bgcolor=#E9E9E9
| 477017 ||  || — || December 29, 2008 || Kitt Peak || Spacewatch || WIT || align=right | 1.0 km || 
|-id=018 bgcolor=#E9E9E9
| 477018 ||  || — || December 30, 2008 || Mount Lemmon || Mount Lemmon Survey || — || align=right | 1.3 km || 
|-id=019 bgcolor=#E9E9E9
| 477019 ||  || — || December 21, 2008 || Kitt Peak || Spacewatch || EUN || align=right data-sort-value="0.92" | 920 m || 
|-id=020 bgcolor=#E9E9E9
| 477020 ||  || — || February 9, 2005 || Mount Lemmon || Mount Lemmon Survey || — || align=right | 1.2 km || 
|-id=021 bgcolor=#E9E9E9
| 477021 ||  || — || December 22, 2008 || Kitt Peak || Spacewatch || — || align=right | 1.8 km || 
|-id=022 bgcolor=#E9E9E9
| 477022 ||  || — || December 21, 2008 || Mount Lemmon || Mount Lemmon Survey || — || align=right data-sort-value="0.82" | 820 m || 
|-id=023 bgcolor=#E9E9E9
| 477023 ||  || — || December 22, 2008 || Mount Lemmon || Mount Lemmon Survey || — || align=right | 2.8 km || 
|-id=024 bgcolor=#E9E9E9
| 477024 ||  || — || December 22, 2008 || Kitt Peak || Spacewatch || (5) || align=right data-sort-value="0.65" | 650 m || 
|-id=025 bgcolor=#E9E9E9
| 477025 ||  || — || December 30, 2008 || Kitt Peak || Spacewatch || — || align=right | 1.4 km || 
|-id=026 bgcolor=#E9E9E9
| 477026 ||  || — || March 4, 2005 || Mount Lemmon || Mount Lemmon Survey || — || align=right | 1.2 km || 
|-id=027 bgcolor=#E9E9E9
| 477027 ||  || — || December 31, 2008 || Mount Lemmon || Mount Lemmon Survey || — || align=right | 1.5 km || 
|-id=028 bgcolor=#E9E9E9
| 477028 ||  || — || December 29, 2008 || Kitt Peak || Spacewatch || — || align=right | 1.3 km || 
|-id=029 bgcolor=#E9E9E9
| 477029 ||  || — || January 2, 2009 || Mount Lemmon || Mount Lemmon Survey || — || align=right | 1.9 km || 
|-id=030 bgcolor=#E9E9E9
| 477030 ||  || — || November 8, 2008 || Mount Lemmon || Mount Lemmon Survey || — || align=right | 1.9 km || 
|-id=031 bgcolor=#E9E9E9
| 477031 ||  || — || January 2, 2009 || Mount Lemmon || Mount Lemmon Survey || — || align=right | 1.0 km || 
|-id=032 bgcolor=#E9E9E9
| 477032 ||  || — || January 15, 2009 || Calar Alto || F. Hormuth || — || align=right | 2.7 km || 
|-id=033 bgcolor=#E9E9E9
| 477033 ||  || — || January 2, 2009 || Kitt Peak || Spacewatch || — || align=right | 2.8 km || 
|-id=034 bgcolor=#E9E9E9
| 477034 ||  || — || November 24, 2008 || Mount Lemmon || Mount Lemmon Survey || — || align=right | 1.9 km || 
|-id=035 bgcolor=#E9E9E9
| 477035 ||  || — || January 3, 2009 || Kitt Peak || Spacewatch || — || align=right | 2.2 km || 
|-id=036 bgcolor=#E9E9E9
| 477036 ||  || — || January 3, 2009 || Kitt Peak || Spacewatch || — || align=right | 2.2 km || 
|-id=037 bgcolor=#E9E9E9
| 477037 ||  || — || December 21, 2008 || Kitt Peak || Spacewatch || — || align=right | 2.2 km || 
|-id=038 bgcolor=#E9E9E9
| 477038 ||  || — || December 21, 2008 || Mount Lemmon || Mount Lemmon Survey || (5) || align=right data-sort-value="0.75" | 750 m || 
|-id=039 bgcolor=#E9E9E9
| 477039 ||  || — || December 22, 2008 || Mount Lemmon || Mount Lemmon Survey || — || align=right | 1.4 km || 
|-id=040 bgcolor=#E9E9E9
| 477040 ||  || — || December 21, 2008 || Kitt Peak || Spacewatch || — || align=right | 2.8 km || 
|-id=041 bgcolor=#E9E9E9
| 477041 ||  || — || November 30, 2008 || Mount Lemmon || Mount Lemmon Survey || (5) || align=right data-sort-value="0.77" | 770 m || 
|-id=042 bgcolor=#E9E9E9
| 477042 ||  || — || January 15, 2009 || Kitt Peak || Spacewatch || — || align=right | 2.1 km || 
|-id=043 bgcolor=#E9E9E9
| 477043 ||  || — || January 15, 2009 || Kitt Peak || Spacewatch || — || align=right | 1.6 km || 
|-id=044 bgcolor=#E9E9E9
| 477044 ||  || — || November 8, 2008 || Mount Lemmon || Mount Lemmon Survey || — || align=right data-sort-value="0.94" | 940 m || 
|-id=045 bgcolor=#E9E9E9
| 477045 ||  || — || January 2, 2009 || Kitt Peak || Spacewatch || — || align=right | 2.5 km || 
|-id=046 bgcolor=#E9E9E9
| 477046 ||  || — || December 1, 2008 || Mount Lemmon || Mount Lemmon Survey || — || align=right | 1.0 km || 
|-id=047 bgcolor=#E9E9E9
| 477047 ||  || — || January 3, 2009 || Mount Lemmon || Mount Lemmon Survey || — || align=right | 1.3 km || 
|-id=048 bgcolor=#E9E9E9
| 477048 ||  || — || January 1, 2009 || Kitt Peak || Spacewatch || — || align=right | 2.0 km || 
|-id=049 bgcolor=#E9E9E9
| 477049 ||  || — || January 2, 2009 || Mount Lemmon || Mount Lemmon Survey || — || align=right | 2.5 km || 
|-id=050 bgcolor=#E9E9E9
| 477050 ||  || — || January 1, 2009 || Mount Lemmon || Mount Lemmon Survey || — || align=right | 2.1 km || 
|-id=051 bgcolor=#FFC2E0
| 477051 ||  || — || January 19, 2009 || Catalina || CSS || AMO +1km || align=right data-sort-value="0.99" | 990 m || 
|-id=052 bgcolor=#fefefe
| 477052 ||  || — || December 31, 2008 || Mount Lemmon || Mount Lemmon Survey || H || align=right data-sort-value="0.71" | 710 m || 
|-id=053 bgcolor=#E9E9E9
| 477053 ||  || — || November 21, 2008 || Catalina || CSS || — || align=right | 1.1 km || 
|-id=054 bgcolor=#E9E9E9
| 477054 ||  || — || January 20, 2009 || Bergisch Gladbach || W. Bickel || MRX || align=right data-sort-value="0.92" | 920 m || 
|-id=055 bgcolor=#E9E9E9
| 477055 ||  || — || January 20, 2009 || Socorro || LINEAR || — || align=right | 1.4 km || 
|-id=056 bgcolor=#E9E9E9
| 477056 ||  || — || December 22, 2008 || Kitt Peak || Spacewatch || (5) || align=right data-sort-value="0.76" | 760 m || 
|-id=057 bgcolor=#E9E9E9
| 477057 ||  || — || December 29, 2008 || Kitt Peak || Spacewatch || — || align=right | 1.7 km || 
|-id=058 bgcolor=#d6d6d6
| 477058 ||  || — || January 16, 2009 || Kitt Peak || Spacewatch || — || align=right | 2.3 km || 
|-id=059 bgcolor=#E9E9E9
| 477059 ||  || — || January 16, 2009 || Kitt Peak || Spacewatch || — || align=right | 1.3 km || 
|-id=060 bgcolor=#E9E9E9
| 477060 ||  || — || January 2, 2009 || Mount Lemmon || Mount Lemmon Survey || — || align=right | 2.0 km || 
|-id=061 bgcolor=#E9E9E9
| 477061 ||  || — || January 16, 2009 || Kitt Peak || Spacewatch || MRX || align=right data-sort-value="0.89" | 890 m || 
|-id=062 bgcolor=#E9E9E9
| 477062 ||  || — || January 16, 2009 || Kitt Peak || Spacewatch || ADE || align=right | 2.0 km || 
|-id=063 bgcolor=#E9E9E9
| 477063 ||  || — || January 16, 2009 || Kitt Peak || Spacewatch || NEM || align=right | 2.2 km || 
|-id=064 bgcolor=#E9E9E9
| 477064 ||  || — || January 16, 2009 || Kitt Peak || Spacewatch || — || align=right | 1.5 km || 
|-id=065 bgcolor=#E9E9E9
| 477065 ||  || — || January 16, 2009 || Mount Lemmon || Mount Lemmon Survey || — || align=right | 2.3 km || 
|-id=066 bgcolor=#d6d6d6
| 477066 ||  || — || January 18, 2009 || Mount Lemmon || Mount Lemmon Survey || — || align=right | 1.8 km || 
|-id=067 bgcolor=#E9E9E9
| 477067 ||  || — || January 20, 2009 || Kitt Peak || Spacewatch || — || align=right | 1.5 km || 
|-id=068 bgcolor=#E9E9E9
| 477068 ||  || — || December 21, 2008 || Catalina || CSS || — || align=right | 1.6 km || 
|-id=069 bgcolor=#E9E9E9
| 477069 ||  || — || December 21, 2008 || Mount Lemmon || Mount Lemmon Survey || — || align=right | 1.3 km || 
|-id=070 bgcolor=#E9E9E9
| 477070 ||  || — || January 20, 2009 || Kitt Peak || Spacewatch || AGN || align=right | 1.2 km || 
|-id=071 bgcolor=#E9E9E9
| 477071 ||  || — || December 1, 2008 || Mount Lemmon || Mount Lemmon Survey || — || align=right | 2.3 km || 
|-id=072 bgcolor=#E9E9E9
| 477072 ||  || — || November 8, 2008 || Mount Lemmon || Mount Lemmon Survey || — || align=right | 1.8 km || 
|-id=073 bgcolor=#E9E9E9
| 477073 ||  || — || January 2, 2009 || Mount Lemmon || Mount Lemmon Survey || MRX || align=right | 1.1 km || 
|-id=074 bgcolor=#E9E9E9
| 477074 ||  || — || December 4, 2008 || Catalina || CSS || — || align=right | 1.7 km || 
|-id=075 bgcolor=#E9E9E9
| 477075 ||  || — || January 30, 2009 || Socorro || LINEAR || EUN || align=right | 1.4 km || 
|-id=076 bgcolor=#E9E9E9
| 477076 ||  || — || January 30, 2009 || Socorro || LINEAR || — || align=right | 3.7 km || 
|-id=077 bgcolor=#E9E9E9
| 477077 ||  || — || January 30, 2009 || Socorro || LINEAR || — || align=right data-sort-value="0.78" | 780 m || 
|-id=078 bgcolor=#E9E9E9
| 477078 ||  || — || January 25, 2009 || Kitt Peak || Spacewatch || — || align=right | 1.7 km || 
|-id=079 bgcolor=#d6d6d6
| 477079 ||  || — || January 25, 2009 || Kitt Peak || Spacewatch || KOR || align=right | 1.1 km || 
|-id=080 bgcolor=#E9E9E9
| 477080 ||  || — || January 15, 2009 || Kitt Peak || Spacewatch || — || align=right | 1.9 km || 
|-id=081 bgcolor=#E9E9E9
| 477081 ||  || — || January 25, 2009 || Kitt Peak || Spacewatch || — || align=right | 2.2 km || 
|-id=082 bgcolor=#E9E9E9
| 477082 ||  || — || January 25, 2009 || Kitt Peak || Spacewatch || — || align=right | 1.1 km || 
|-id=083 bgcolor=#E9E9E9
| 477083 ||  || — || January 26, 2009 || Mount Lemmon || Mount Lemmon Survey || — || align=right | 1.4 km || 
|-id=084 bgcolor=#d6d6d6
| 477084 ||  || — || January 25, 2009 || Kitt Peak || Spacewatch || — || align=right | 3.2 km || 
|-id=085 bgcolor=#E9E9E9
| 477085 ||  || — || January 25, 2009 || Kitt Peak || Spacewatch || — || align=right | 1.5 km || 
|-id=086 bgcolor=#E9E9E9
| 477086 ||  || — || December 31, 2008 || Mount Lemmon || Mount Lemmon Survey || — || align=right | 2.4 km || 
|-id=087 bgcolor=#E9E9E9
| 477087 ||  || — || January 26, 2009 || Mount Lemmon || Mount Lemmon Survey || — || align=right data-sort-value="0.95" | 950 m || 
|-id=088 bgcolor=#E9E9E9
| 477088 ||  || — || January 26, 2009 || Kitt Peak || Spacewatch || — || align=right data-sort-value="0.96" | 960 m || 
|-id=089 bgcolor=#E9E9E9
| 477089 ||  || — || January 17, 2009 || Kitt Peak || Spacewatch || — || align=right | 2.4 km || 
|-id=090 bgcolor=#d6d6d6
| 477090 ||  || — || January 21, 2009 || Kitt Peak || Spacewatch || EOS || align=right | 1.6 km || 
|-id=091 bgcolor=#E9E9E9
| 477091 ||  || — || January 30, 2009 || Mount Lemmon || Mount Lemmon Survey || — || align=right | 1.9 km || 
|-id=092 bgcolor=#d6d6d6
| 477092 ||  || — || January 15, 2009 || Kitt Peak || Spacewatch || EOS || align=right | 1.6 km || 
|-id=093 bgcolor=#E9E9E9
| 477093 ||  || — || January 30, 2009 || Kitt Peak || Spacewatch || — || align=right | 1.7 km || 
|-id=094 bgcolor=#E9E9E9
| 477094 ||  || — || January 30, 2009 || Kitt Peak || Spacewatch || — || align=right | 1.7 km || 
|-id=095 bgcolor=#d6d6d6
| 477095 ||  || — || November 23, 2008 || Mount Lemmon || Mount Lemmon Survey || EOS || align=right | 1.9 km || 
|-id=096 bgcolor=#E9E9E9
| 477096 ||  || — || January 30, 2009 || Mount Lemmon || Mount Lemmon Survey || — || align=right | 1.1 km || 
|-id=097 bgcolor=#E9E9E9
| 477097 ||  || — || January 30, 2009 || Mount Lemmon || Mount Lemmon Survey || — || align=right data-sort-value="0.95" | 950 m || 
|-id=098 bgcolor=#E9E9E9
| 477098 ||  || — || January 30, 2009 || Mount Lemmon || Mount Lemmon Survey || — || align=right | 1.1 km || 
|-id=099 bgcolor=#d6d6d6
| 477099 ||  || — || November 23, 2008 || Mount Lemmon || Mount Lemmon Survey || — || align=right | 3.3 km || 
|-id=100 bgcolor=#E9E9E9
| 477100 ||  || — || January 31, 2009 || Kitt Peak || Spacewatch || critical || align=right data-sort-value="0.96" | 960 m || 
|}

477101–477200 

|-bgcolor=#E9E9E9
| 477101 ||  || — || January 31, 2009 || Kitt Peak || Spacewatch || — || align=right | 1.9 km || 
|-id=102 bgcolor=#E9E9E9
| 477102 ||  || — || January 31, 2009 || Kitt Peak || Spacewatch || AGN || align=right | 1.1 km || 
|-id=103 bgcolor=#d6d6d6
| 477103 ||  || — || January 30, 2009 || Mount Lemmon || Mount Lemmon Survey || KOR || align=right | 1.4 km || 
|-id=104 bgcolor=#d6d6d6
| 477104 ||  || — || January 31, 2009 || Kitt Peak || Spacewatch || — || align=right | 3.0 km || 
|-id=105 bgcolor=#E9E9E9
| 477105 ||  || — || January 31, 2009 || Mount Lemmon || Mount Lemmon Survey || — || align=right | 1.8 km || 
|-id=106 bgcolor=#d6d6d6
| 477106 ||  || — || December 30, 2008 || Mount Lemmon || Mount Lemmon Survey || LIX || align=right | 3.1 km || 
|-id=107 bgcolor=#d6d6d6
| 477107 ||  || — || January 18, 2009 || Mount Lemmon || Mount Lemmon Survey || KOR || align=right | 1.3 km || 
|-id=108 bgcolor=#E9E9E9
| 477108 ||  || — || January 25, 2009 || Kitt Peak || Spacewatch || — || align=right | 1.6 km || 
|-id=109 bgcolor=#E9E9E9
| 477109 ||  || — || January 29, 2009 || Mount Lemmon || Mount Lemmon Survey || — || align=right | 2.3 km || 
|-id=110 bgcolor=#d6d6d6
| 477110 ||  || — || January 30, 2009 || Mount Lemmon || Mount Lemmon Survey || — || align=right | 2.4 km || 
|-id=111 bgcolor=#d6d6d6
| 477111 ||  || — || January 31, 2009 || Mount Lemmon || Mount Lemmon Survey || — || align=right | 2.7 km || 
|-id=112 bgcolor=#E9E9E9
| 477112 ||  || — || January 31, 2009 || Kitt Peak || Spacewatch || — || align=right | 1.1 km || 
|-id=113 bgcolor=#E9E9E9
| 477113 ||  || — || January 21, 2009 || Catalina || CSS || — || align=right | 3.1 km || 
|-id=114 bgcolor=#E9E9E9
| 477114 ||  || — || January 16, 2009 || Socorro || LINEAR || fast? || align=right | 2.0 km || 
|-id=115 bgcolor=#E9E9E9
| 477115 ||  || — || January 20, 2009 || Kitt Peak || Spacewatch || — || align=right data-sort-value="0.90" | 900 m || 
|-id=116 bgcolor=#d6d6d6
| 477116 ||  || — || January 17, 2009 || Kitt Peak || Spacewatch || NAE || align=right | 2.4 km || 
|-id=117 bgcolor=#d6d6d6
| 477117 ||  || — || January 31, 2009 || Mount Lemmon || Mount Lemmon Survey || — || align=right | 2.5 km || 
|-id=118 bgcolor=#E9E9E9
| 477118 ||  || — || January 18, 2009 || Kitt Peak || Spacewatch || — || align=right | 1.4 km || 
|-id=119 bgcolor=#E9E9E9
| 477119 ||  || — || February 1, 2009 || Kitt Peak || Spacewatch || HOF || align=right | 2.4 km || 
|-id=120 bgcolor=#E9E9E9
| 477120 ||  || — || February 1, 2009 || Kitt Peak || Spacewatch || AEO || align=right | 1.1 km || 
|-id=121 bgcolor=#d6d6d6
| 477121 ||  || — || February 1, 2009 || Kitt Peak || Spacewatch || — || align=right | 2.6 km || 
|-id=122 bgcolor=#E9E9E9
| 477122 ||  || — || February 1, 2009 || Kitt Peak || Spacewatch || — || align=right | 1.7 km || 
|-id=123 bgcolor=#E9E9E9
| 477123 ||  || — || February 3, 2009 || Kitt Peak || Spacewatch || — || align=right | 2.2 km || 
|-id=124 bgcolor=#E9E9E9
| 477124 ||  || — || February 2, 2009 || Catalina || CSS || — || align=right | 1.1 km || 
|-id=125 bgcolor=#E9E9E9
| 477125 ||  || — || December 4, 2008 || Mount Lemmon || Mount Lemmon Survey || — || align=right | 1.7 km || 
|-id=126 bgcolor=#E9E9E9
| 477126 ||  || — || March 8, 2000 || Kitt Peak || Spacewatch || — || align=right | 2.3 km || 
|-id=127 bgcolor=#E9E9E9
| 477127 ||  || — || February 14, 2009 || Kitt Peak || Spacewatch || EUN || align=right | 1.3 km || 
|-id=128 bgcolor=#d6d6d6
| 477128 ||  || — || February 14, 2009 || Mount Lemmon || Mount Lemmon Survey || — || align=right | 3.0 km || 
|-id=129 bgcolor=#fefefe
| 477129 ||  || — || January 18, 2009 || Kitt Peak || Spacewatch || — || align=right data-sort-value="0.59" | 590 m || 
|-id=130 bgcolor=#E9E9E9
| 477130 ||  || — || February 2, 2009 || Kitt Peak || Spacewatch || — || align=right | 2.1 km || 
|-id=131 bgcolor=#E9E9E9
| 477131 ||  || — || February 14, 2009 || Kitt Peak || Spacewatch || — || align=right | 1.8 km || 
|-id=132 bgcolor=#E9E9E9
| 477132 ||  || — || September 20, 2003 || Kitt Peak || Spacewatch || (1547) || align=right data-sort-value="0.98" | 980 m || 
|-id=133 bgcolor=#E9E9E9
| 477133 ||  || — || February 17, 2009 || Calar Alto || F. Hormuth || critical || align=right data-sort-value="0.86" | 860 m || 
|-id=134 bgcolor=#E9E9E9
| 477134 ||  || — || February 13, 2009 || Kitt Peak || Spacewatch || — || align=right | 1.9 km || 
|-id=135 bgcolor=#E9E9E9
| 477135 ||  || — || February 21, 2009 || Calar Alto || F. Hormuth || — || align=right data-sort-value="0.96" | 960 m || 
|-id=136 bgcolor=#E9E9E9
| 477136 ||  || — || February 19, 2009 || Mount Lemmon || Mount Lemmon Survey || HOF || align=right | 2.8 km || 
|-id=137 bgcolor=#E9E9E9
| 477137 ||  || — || February 19, 2009 || Mount Lemmon || Mount Lemmon Survey || — || align=right | 1.8 km || 
|-id=138 bgcolor=#fefefe
| 477138 ||  || — || January 23, 2009 || XuYi || PMO NEO || H || align=right data-sort-value="0.75" | 750 m || 
|-id=139 bgcolor=#E9E9E9
| 477139 ||  || — || January 20, 2009 || Mount Lemmon || Mount Lemmon Survey || — || align=right | 1.6 km || 
|-id=140 bgcolor=#E9E9E9
| 477140 ||  || — || February 19, 2009 || La Sagra || OAM Obs. || — || align=right | 2.5 km || 
|-id=141 bgcolor=#d6d6d6
| 477141 ||  || — || February 20, 2009 || Kitt Peak || Spacewatch || — || align=right | 3.9 km || 
|-id=142 bgcolor=#fefefe
| 477142 ||  || — || February 1, 2009 || Kitt Peak || Spacewatch || H || align=right data-sort-value="0.60" | 600 m || 
|-id=143 bgcolor=#E9E9E9
| 477143 ||  || — || February 5, 2009 || Kitt Peak || Spacewatch || — || align=right | 1.1 km || 
|-id=144 bgcolor=#E9E9E9
| 477144 ||  || — || February 20, 2009 || Dauban || F. Kugel ||  || align=right | 1.9 km || 
|-id=145 bgcolor=#E9E9E9
| 477145 ||  || — || February 18, 2009 || La Sagra || OAM Obs. || — || align=right | 1.2 km || 
|-id=146 bgcolor=#E9E9E9
| 477146 ||  || — || January 29, 2009 || Mount Lemmon || Mount Lemmon Survey || — || align=right | 2.5 km || 
|-id=147 bgcolor=#E9E9E9
| 477147 ||  || — || February 22, 2009 || Kitt Peak || Spacewatch || — || align=right | 2.1 km || 
|-id=148 bgcolor=#E9E9E9
| 477148 ||  || — || February 19, 2009 || Catalina || CSS || — || align=right | 1.8 km || 
|-id=149 bgcolor=#E9E9E9
| 477149 ||  || — || February 13, 2009 || Kitt Peak || Spacewatch || — || align=right | 2.6 km || 
|-id=150 bgcolor=#E9E9E9
| 477150 ||  || — || February 21, 2009 || Kitt Peak || Spacewatch || — || align=right | 1.9 km || 
|-id=151 bgcolor=#d6d6d6
| 477151 ||  || — || February 22, 2009 || Kitt Peak || Spacewatch || — || align=right | 2.1 km || 
|-id=152 bgcolor=#d6d6d6
| 477152 ||  || — || February 26, 2009 || Kitt Peak || Spacewatch || KOR || align=right | 1.5 km || 
|-id=153 bgcolor=#fefefe
| 477153 ||  || — || February 22, 2009 || Kitt Peak || Spacewatch || — || align=right data-sort-value="0.65" | 650 m || 
|-id=154 bgcolor=#E9E9E9
| 477154 ||  || — || February 26, 2009 || Mount Lemmon || Mount Lemmon Survey || AEO || align=right | 1.0 km || 
|-id=155 bgcolor=#d6d6d6
| 477155 ||  || — || February 27, 2009 || Kitt Peak || Spacewatch || — || align=right | 4.4 km || 
|-id=156 bgcolor=#d6d6d6
| 477156 ||  || — || February 27, 2009 || Mount Lemmon || Mount Lemmon Survey || — || align=right | 3.3 km || 
|-id=157 bgcolor=#E9E9E9
| 477157 ||  || — || February 22, 2009 || Kitt Peak || Spacewatch || — || align=right | 1.8 km || 
|-id=158 bgcolor=#d6d6d6
| 477158 ||  || — || February 19, 2009 || Kitt Peak || Spacewatch || — || align=right | 2.6 km || 
|-id=159 bgcolor=#d6d6d6
| 477159 ||  || — || February 27, 2009 || Kitt Peak || Spacewatch || — || align=right | 2.2 km || 
|-id=160 bgcolor=#E9E9E9
| 477160 ||  || — || October 14, 2007 || Mount Lemmon || Mount Lemmon Survey || — || align=right | 2.1 km || 
|-id=161 bgcolor=#d6d6d6
| 477161 ||  || — || February 20, 2009 || Kitt Peak || Spacewatch || — || align=right | 2.5 km || 
|-id=162 bgcolor=#FFC2E0
| 477162 ||  || — || March 2, 2009 || Mount Lemmon || Mount Lemmon Survey || APOPHA || align=right data-sort-value="0.26" | 260 m || 
|-id=163 bgcolor=#E9E9E9
| 477163 ||  || — || February 3, 2009 || Kitt Peak || Spacewatch || — || align=right | 1.9 km || 
|-id=164 bgcolor=#FA8072
| 477164 ||  || — || February 2, 2009 || Catalina || CSS || — || align=right data-sort-value="0.71" | 710 m || 
|-id=165 bgcolor=#E9E9E9
| 477165 ||  || — || January 30, 2009 || Mount Lemmon || Mount Lemmon Survey || — || align=right | 1.9 km || 
|-id=166 bgcolor=#E9E9E9
| 477166 ||  || — || March 15, 2009 || Kitt Peak || Spacewatch || — || align=right | 2.0 km || 
|-id=167 bgcolor=#d6d6d6
| 477167 ||  || — || March 1, 2009 || Kitt Peak || Spacewatch || — || align=right | 2.3 km || 
|-id=168 bgcolor=#d6d6d6
| 477168 ||  || — || March 2, 2009 || Mount Lemmon || Mount Lemmon Survey || — || align=right | 3.0 km || 
|-id=169 bgcolor=#E9E9E9
| 477169 ||  || — || October 10, 2007 || Kitt Peak || Spacewatch || DOR || align=right | 2.5 km || 
|-id=170 bgcolor=#E9E9E9
| 477170 ||  || — || March 17, 2009 || Needville || J. Dellinger || — || align=right | 1.3 km || 
|-id=171 bgcolor=#E9E9E9
| 477171 ||  || — || March 3, 2009 || Mount Lemmon || Mount Lemmon Survey || — || align=right | 1.9 km || 
|-id=172 bgcolor=#E9E9E9
| 477172 ||  || — || February 2, 2009 || Kitt Peak || Spacewatch || — || align=right | 2.4 km || 
|-id=173 bgcolor=#d6d6d6
| 477173 ||  || — || March 21, 2009 || Catalina || CSS || — || align=right | 2.1 km || 
|-id=174 bgcolor=#d6d6d6
| 477174 ||  || — || March 26, 2004 || Socorro || LINEAR || — || align=right | 4.1 km || 
|-id=175 bgcolor=#d6d6d6
| 477175 ||  || — || March 26, 2009 || Cerro Burek || Alianza S4 Obs. || — || align=right | 3.9 km || 
|-id=176 bgcolor=#E9E9E9
| 477176 ||  || — || March 24, 2009 || Mount Lemmon || Mount Lemmon Survey || — || align=right | 2.6 km || 
|-id=177 bgcolor=#d6d6d6
| 477177 ||  || — || March 27, 2009 || Catalina || CSS || — || align=right | 3.6 km || 
|-id=178 bgcolor=#E9E9E9
| 477178 ||  || — || March 17, 2009 || Kitt Peak || Spacewatch || — || align=right | 2.0 km || 
|-id=179 bgcolor=#E9E9E9
| 477179 ||  || — || March 31, 2009 || Kitt Peak || Spacewatch || — || align=right | 2.4 km || 
|-id=180 bgcolor=#E9E9E9
| 477180 ||  || — || March 21, 2009 || Kitt Peak || Spacewatch || — || align=right | 1.8 km || 
|-id=181 bgcolor=#d6d6d6
| 477181 ||  || — || September 17, 2006 || Kitt Peak || Spacewatch || — || align=right | 2.2 km || 
|-id=182 bgcolor=#d6d6d6
| 477182 ||  || — || March 16, 2009 || Mount Lemmon || Mount Lemmon Survey || — || align=right | 2.1 km || 
|-id=183 bgcolor=#d6d6d6
| 477183 ||  || — || March 2, 2009 || Kitt Peak || Spacewatch || EOS || align=right | 1.7 km || 
|-id=184 bgcolor=#d6d6d6
| 477184 ||  || — || March 17, 2009 || Kitt Peak || Spacewatch || — || align=right | 2.5 km || 
|-id=185 bgcolor=#d6d6d6
| 477185 ||  || — || March 17, 2009 || Kitt Peak || Spacewatch || — || align=right | 3.3 km || 
|-id=186 bgcolor=#fefefe
| 477186 ||  || — || March 18, 2009 || Kitt Peak || Spacewatch || — || align=right data-sort-value="0.52" | 520 m || 
|-id=187 bgcolor=#E9E9E9
| 477187 ||  || — || March 27, 2009 || Mount Lemmon || Mount Lemmon Survey || — || align=right | 1.6 km || 
|-id=188 bgcolor=#d6d6d6
| 477188 ||  || — || February 27, 2009 || Catalina || CSS || — || align=right | 3.4 km || 
|-id=189 bgcolor=#d6d6d6
| 477189 ||  || — || April 1, 2009 || Cerro Burek || Alianza S4 Obs. || — || align=right | 3.1 km || 
|-id=190 bgcolor=#d6d6d6
| 477190 ||  || — || April 17, 2009 || Kitt Peak || Spacewatch || — || align=right | 2.5 km || 
|-id=191 bgcolor=#d6d6d6
| 477191 ||  || — || April 17, 2009 || Kitt Peak || Spacewatch || — || align=right | 2.6 km || 
|-id=192 bgcolor=#d6d6d6
| 477192 ||  || — || March 27, 2009 || Mount Lemmon || Mount Lemmon Survey || — || align=right | 2.9 km || 
|-id=193 bgcolor=#d6d6d6
| 477193 ||  || — || April 19, 2009 || Great Shefford || P. Birtwhistle || — || align=right | 2.9 km || 
|-id=194 bgcolor=#E9E9E9
| 477194 ||  || — || March 21, 2009 || Kitt Peak || Spacewatch || — || align=right | 1.5 km || 
|-id=195 bgcolor=#d6d6d6
| 477195 ||  || — || April 19, 2009 || Kitt Peak || Spacewatch || — || align=right | 3.3 km || 
|-id=196 bgcolor=#d6d6d6
| 477196 ||  || — || April 17, 2009 || Kitt Peak || Spacewatch || — || align=right | 2.7 km || 
|-id=197 bgcolor=#d6d6d6
| 477197 ||  || — || April 2, 2009 || Kitt Peak || Spacewatch || — || align=right | 2.7 km || 
|-id=198 bgcolor=#d6d6d6
| 477198 ||  || — || April 20, 2009 || Kitt Peak || Spacewatch || — || align=right | 2.6 km || 
|-id=199 bgcolor=#d6d6d6
| 477199 ||  || — || March 21, 2009 || Kitt Peak || Spacewatch || — || align=right | 2.5 km || 
|-id=200 bgcolor=#d6d6d6
| 477200 ||  || — || April 23, 2009 || Kitt Peak || Spacewatch || — || align=right | 2.8 km || 
|}

477201–477300 

|-bgcolor=#d6d6d6
| 477201 ||  || — || April 26, 2009 || Mount Lemmon || Mount Lemmon Survey || — || align=right | 2.8 km || 
|-id=202 bgcolor=#d6d6d6
| 477202 ||  || — || April 22, 2009 || Mount Lemmon || Mount Lemmon Survey || — || align=right | 2.8 km || 
|-id=203 bgcolor=#d6d6d6
| 477203 ||  || — || April 22, 2009 || Mount Lemmon || Mount Lemmon Survey || — || align=right | 2.9 km || 
|-id=204 bgcolor=#d6d6d6
| 477204 ||  || — || April 28, 2009 || Catalina || CSS || — || align=right | 2.3 km || 
|-id=205 bgcolor=#d6d6d6
| 477205 ||  || — || April 21, 2009 || Mount Lemmon || Mount Lemmon Survey || — || align=right | 2.2 km || 
|-id=206 bgcolor=#d6d6d6
| 477206 ||  || — || April 18, 2009 || Kitt Peak || Spacewatch || — || align=right | 3.7 km || 
|-id=207 bgcolor=#d6d6d6
| 477207 ||  || — || April 22, 2009 || Mount Lemmon || Mount Lemmon Survey || — || align=right | 2.2 km || 
|-id=208 bgcolor=#d6d6d6
| 477208 ||  || — || April 23, 2009 || Kitt Peak || Spacewatch || — || align=right | 2.7 km || 
|-id=209 bgcolor=#fefefe
| 477209 ||  || — || April 27, 2009 || Mount Lemmon || Mount Lemmon Survey || — || align=right data-sort-value="0.69" | 690 m || 
|-id=210 bgcolor=#d6d6d6
| 477210 ||  || — || May 13, 2009 || Kitt Peak || Spacewatch || — || align=right | 2.7 km || 
|-id=211 bgcolor=#d6d6d6
| 477211 ||  || — || May 13, 2009 || Kitt Peak || Spacewatch || — || align=right | 4.3 km || 
|-id=212 bgcolor=#d6d6d6
| 477212 ||  || — || May 13, 2009 || Kitt Peak || Spacewatch || — || align=right | 3.3 km || 
|-id=213 bgcolor=#d6d6d6
| 477213 ||  || — || May 13, 2009 || Kitt Peak || Spacewatch || — || align=right | 3.0 km || 
|-id=214 bgcolor=#d6d6d6
| 477214 ||  || — || May 1, 2009 || Mount Lemmon || Mount Lemmon Survey || — || align=right | 3.6 km || 
|-id=215 bgcolor=#d6d6d6
| 477215 ||  || — || April 20, 2009 || Kitt Peak || Spacewatch || (8737) || align=right | 2.8 km || 
|-id=216 bgcolor=#fefefe
| 477216 ||  || — || May 24, 2009 || Kitt Peak || Spacewatch || — || align=right data-sort-value="0.57" | 570 m || 
|-id=217 bgcolor=#d6d6d6
| 477217 ||  || — || April 23, 2009 || Kitt Peak || Spacewatch || — || align=right | 2.5 km || 
|-id=218 bgcolor=#d6d6d6
| 477218 ||  || — || May 15, 2009 || Kitt Peak || Spacewatch || — || align=right | 2.1 km || 
|-id=219 bgcolor=#fefefe
| 477219 ||  || — || April 30, 2009 || Kitt Peak || Spacewatch || — || align=right data-sort-value="0.51" | 510 m || 
|-id=220 bgcolor=#d6d6d6
| 477220 ||  || — || September 13, 2004 || Kitt Peak || Spacewatch || — || align=right | 5.1 km || 
|-id=221 bgcolor=#d6d6d6
| 477221 ||  || — || June 14, 2009 || Catalina || CSS || Tj (2.95) || align=right | 5.2 km || 
|-id=222 bgcolor=#fefefe
| 477222 ||  || — || August 15, 2009 || Kitt Peak || Spacewatch || NYS || align=right data-sort-value="0.67" | 670 m || 
|-id=223 bgcolor=#fefefe
| 477223 ||  || — || August 15, 2009 || Kitt Peak || Spacewatch || — || align=right data-sort-value="0.66" | 660 m || 
|-id=224 bgcolor=#fefefe
| 477224 ||  || — || August 15, 2009 || Catalina || CSS || — || align=right data-sort-value="0.79" | 790 m || 
|-id=225 bgcolor=#fefefe
| 477225 ||  || — || March 10, 2008 || Kitt Peak || Spacewatch || V || align=right data-sort-value="0.55" | 550 m || 
|-id=226 bgcolor=#fefefe
| 477226 ||  || — || August 15, 2009 || Kitt Peak || Spacewatch || critical || align=right data-sort-value="0.62" | 620 m || 
|-id=227 bgcolor=#FA8072
| 477227 ||  || — || August 16, 2009 || Kitt Peak || Spacewatch || — || align=right data-sort-value="0.65" | 650 m || 
|-id=228 bgcolor=#fefefe
| 477228 ||  || — || August 26, 2009 || La Sagra || OAM Obs. || — || align=right data-sort-value="0.80" | 800 m || 
|-id=229 bgcolor=#fefefe
| 477229 ||  || — || August 20, 2009 || Kitt Peak || Spacewatch || — || align=right data-sort-value="0.60" | 600 m || 
|-id=230 bgcolor=#FA8072
| 477230 ||  || — || September 10, 2009 || Catalina || CSS || fast? || align=right data-sort-value="0.78" | 780 m || 
|-id=231 bgcolor=#fefefe
| 477231 ||  || — || September 12, 2009 || Kitt Peak || Spacewatch || — || align=right data-sort-value="0.82" | 820 m || 
|-id=232 bgcolor=#fefefe
| 477232 ||  || — || September 12, 2009 || Kitt Peak || Spacewatch || — || align=right data-sort-value="0.64" | 640 m || 
|-id=233 bgcolor=#fefefe
| 477233 ||  || — || September 12, 2009 || Kitt Peak || Spacewatch || — || align=right data-sort-value="0.88" | 880 m || 
|-id=234 bgcolor=#fefefe
| 477234 ||  || — || September 12, 2009 || Kitt Peak || Spacewatch || — || align=right data-sort-value="0.54" | 540 m || 
|-id=235 bgcolor=#fefefe
| 477235 ||  || — || September 14, 2009 || Catalina || CSS || — || align=right data-sort-value="0.65" | 650 m || 
|-id=236 bgcolor=#fefefe
| 477236 ||  || — || September 14, 2009 || Kitt Peak || Spacewatch || — || align=right | 1.1 km || 
|-id=237 bgcolor=#fefefe
| 477237 ||  || — || September 14, 2009 || Kitt Peak || Spacewatch || — || align=right data-sort-value="0.81" | 810 m || 
|-id=238 bgcolor=#fefefe
| 477238 ||  || — || September 14, 2009 || Kitt Peak || Spacewatch || — || align=right data-sort-value="0.58" | 580 m || 
|-id=239 bgcolor=#fefefe
| 477239 ||  || — || September 14, 2009 || Kitt Peak || Spacewatch || — || align=right | 1.0 km || 
|-id=240 bgcolor=#fefefe
| 477240 ||  || — || September 15, 2009 || Kitt Peak || Spacewatch || — || align=right data-sort-value="0.68" | 680 m || 
|-id=241 bgcolor=#fefefe
| 477241 ||  || — || September 15, 2009 || Kitt Peak || Spacewatch || — || align=right data-sort-value="0.54" | 540 m || 
|-id=242 bgcolor=#fefefe
| 477242 ||  || — || September 15, 2009 || Kitt Peak || Spacewatch || — || align=right data-sort-value="0.68" | 680 m || 
|-id=243 bgcolor=#fefefe
| 477243 ||  || — || September 15, 2009 || Kitt Peak || Spacewatch || — || align=right data-sort-value="0.52" | 520 m || 
|-id=244 bgcolor=#fefefe
| 477244 ||  || — || September 15, 2009 || Kitt Peak || Spacewatch || — || align=right data-sort-value="0.75" | 750 m || 
|-id=245 bgcolor=#fefefe
| 477245 ||  || — || September 15, 2009 || Kitt Peak || Spacewatch || — || align=right data-sort-value="0.87" | 870 m || 
|-id=246 bgcolor=#fefefe
| 477246 ||  || — || September 12, 2009 || Kitt Peak || Spacewatch || — || align=right data-sort-value="0.59" | 590 m || 
|-id=247 bgcolor=#fefefe
| 477247 ||  || — || September 12, 2009 || Kitt Peak || Spacewatch || — || align=right data-sort-value="0.60" | 600 m || 
|-id=248 bgcolor=#FFC2E0
| 477248 ||  || — || September 17, 2009 || Mount Lemmon || Mount Lemmon Survey || AMOcritical || align=right data-sort-value="0.39" | 390 m || 
|-id=249 bgcolor=#d6d6d6
| 477249 ||  || — || September 16, 2009 || Mount Lemmon || Mount Lemmon Survey || — || align=right | 2.3 km || 
|-id=250 bgcolor=#fefefe
| 477250 ||  || — || September 16, 2009 || Kitt Peak || Spacewatch || — || align=right data-sort-value="0.70" | 700 m || 
|-id=251 bgcolor=#fefefe
| 477251 ||  || — || September 16, 2009 || Kitt Peak || Spacewatch || — || align=right data-sort-value="0.86" | 860 m || 
|-id=252 bgcolor=#fefefe
| 477252 ||  || — || September 16, 2009 || Kitt Peak || Spacewatch || — || align=right data-sort-value="0.57" | 570 m || 
|-id=253 bgcolor=#fefefe
| 477253 ||  || — || September 16, 2009 || Kitt Peak || Spacewatch || — || align=right data-sort-value="0.70" | 700 m || 
|-id=254 bgcolor=#fefefe
| 477254 ||  || — || February 25, 2007 || Kitt Peak || Spacewatch || — || align=right data-sort-value="0.61" | 610 m || 
|-id=255 bgcolor=#fefefe
| 477255 ||  || — || September 17, 2009 || Kitt Peak || Spacewatch || V || align=right data-sort-value="0.55" | 550 m || 
|-id=256 bgcolor=#fefefe
| 477256 ||  || — || September 17, 2009 || Kitt Peak || Spacewatch || — || align=right data-sort-value="0.65" | 650 m || 
|-id=257 bgcolor=#fefefe
| 477257 ||  || — || September 17, 2009 || Kitt Peak || Spacewatch || — || align=right | 1.2 km || 
|-id=258 bgcolor=#fefefe
| 477258 ||  || — || August 27, 2009 || Kitt Peak || Spacewatch || — || align=right data-sort-value="0.77" | 770 m || 
|-id=259 bgcolor=#fefefe
| 477259 ||  || — || September 17, 2009 || Kitt Peak || Spacewatch || — || align=right data-sort-value="0.64" | 640 m || 
|-id=260 bgcolor=#fefefe
| 477260 ||  || — || September 17, 2009 || Kitt Peak || Spacewatch || — || align=right data-sort-value="0.71" | 710 m || 
|-id=261 bgcolor=#fefefe
| 477261 ||  || — || September 17, 2009 || Kitt Peak || Spacewatch || — || align=right data-sort-value="0.87" | 870 m || 
|-id=262 bgcolor=#fefefe
| 477262 ||  || — || September 17, 2009 || Kitt Peak || Spacewatch || — || align=right data-sort-value="0.61" | 610 m || 
|-id=263 bgcolor=#fefefe
| 477263 ||  || — || September 17, 2009 || Kitt Peak || Spacewatch || — || align=right data-sort-value="0.76" | 760 m || 
|-id=264 bgcolor=#fefefe
| 477264 ||  || — || September 18, 2009 || Kitt Peak || Spacewatch || — || align=right data-sort-value="0.83" | 830 m || 
|-id=265 bgcolor=#fefefe
| 477265 ||  || — || September 18, 2009 || Mount Lemmon || Mount Lemmon Survey || — || align=right data-sort-value="0.62" | 620 m || 
|-id=266 bgcolor=#fefefe
| 477266 ||  || — || September 18, 2009 || Mount Lemmon || Mount Lemmon Survey || — || align=right data-sort-value="0.71" | 710 m || 
|-id=267 bgcolor=#fefefe
| 477267 ||  || — || September 18, 2009 || Kitt Peak || Spacewatch || NYS || align=right data-sort-value="0.70" | 700 m || 
|-id=268 bgcolor=#fefefe
| 477268 ||  || — || September 24, 2009 || Dauban || F. Kugel || — || align=right data-sort-value="0.64" | 640 m || 
|-id=269 bgcolor=#fefefe
| 477269 ||  || — || September 24, 2009 || Dauban || F. Kugel || — || align=right data-sort-value="0.73" | 730 m || 
|-id=270 bgcolor=#fefefe
| 477270 ||  || — || September 16, 2009 || Kitt Peak || Spacewatch || — || align=right data-sort-value="0.84" | 840 m || 
|-id=271 bgcolor=#fefefe
| 477271 ||  || — || September 17, 2009 || Kitt Peak || Spacewatch || — || align=right data-sort-value="0.75" | 750 m || 
|-id=272 bgcolor=#fefefe
| 477272 ||  || — || September 17, 2009 || Kitt Peak || Spacewatch || — || align=right | 1.6 km || 
|-id=273 bgcolor=#fefefe
| 477273 ||  || — || September 18, 2009 || Kitt Peak || Spacewatch || — || align=right data-sort-value="0.81" | 810 m || 
|-id=274 bgcolor=#fefefe
| 477274 ||  || — || September 18, 2009 || Kitt Peak || Spacewatch || — || align=right data-sort-value="0.72" | 720 m || 
|-id=275 bgcolor=#fefefe
| 477275 ||  || — || September 18, 2009 || Kitt Peak || Spacewatch || — || align=right data-sort-value="0.76" | 760 m || 
|-id=276 bgcolor=#fefefe
| 477276 ||  || — || September 18, 2009 || Kitt Peak || Spacewatch || (2076) || align=right data-sort-value="0.78" | 780 m || 
|-id=277 bgcolor=#fefefe
| 477277 ||  || — || September 18, 2009 || Kitt Peak || Spacewatch || — || align=right data-sort-value="0.84" | 840 m || 
|-id=278 bgcolor=#fefefe
| 477278 ||  || — || September 18, 2009 || Kitt Peak || Spacewatch || — || align=right data-sort-value="0.82" | 820 m || 
|-id=279 bgcolor=#fefefe
| 477279 ||  || — || September 18, 2009 || Kitt Peak || Spacewatch || — || align=right data-sort-value="0.73" | 730 m || 
|-id=280 bgcolor=#fefefe
| 477280 ||  || — || September 18, 2009 || Kitt Peak || Spacewatch || — || align=right data-sort-value="0.57" | 570 m || 
|-id=281 bgcolor=#fefefe
| 477281 ||  || — || September 18, 2009 || Kitt Peak || Spacewatch || — || align=right data-sort-value="0.65" | 650 m || 
|-id=282 bgcolor=#fefefe
| 477282 ||  || — || September 19, 2009 || Kitt Peak || Spacewatch || — || align=right data-sort-value="0.78" | 780 m || 
|-id=283 bgcolor=#fefefe
| 477283 ||  || — || August 18, 2009 || Kitt Peak || Spacewatch || — || align=right | 1.1 km || 
|-id=284 bgcolor=#fefefe
| 477284 ||  || — || January 27, 2007 || Mount Lemmon || Mount Lemmon Survey || — || align=right data-sort-value="0.52" | 520 m || 
|-id=285 bgcolor=#fefefe
| 477285 ||  || — || September 12, 2009 || Kitt Peak || Spacewatch || — || align=right data-sort-value="0.64" | 640 m || 
|-id=286 bgcolor=#fefefe
| 477286 ||  || — || September 20, 2009 || Kitt Peak || Spacewatch || — || align=right data-sort-value="0.80" | 800 m || 
|-id=287 bgcolor=#fefefe
| 477287 ||  || — || September 20, 2009 || Kitt Peak || Spacewatch || — || align=right data-sort-value="0.58" | 580 m || 
|-id=288 bgcolor=#fefefe
| 477288 ||  || — || October 14, 1998 || Caussols || ODAS || — || align=right data-sort-value="0.83" | 830 m || 
|-id=289 bgcolor=#fefefe
| 477289 ||  || — || September 25, 2009 || LightBuckets || LightBuckets Obs. || — || align=right data-sort-value="0.75" | 750 m || 
|-id=290 bgcolor=#fefefe
| 477290 ||  || — || September 23, 2009 || Mount Lemmon || Mount Lemmon Survey || NYS || align=right | 1.3 km || 
|-id=291 bgcolor=#fefefe
| 477291 ||  || — || September 27, 2009 || Great Shefford || P. Birtwhistle || — || align=right data-sort-value="0.58" | 580 m || 
|-id=292 bgcolor=#fefefe
| 477292 ||  || — || September 21, 2009 || Kitt Peak || Spacewatch || V || align=right data-sort-value="0.63" | 630 m || 
|-id=293 bgcolor=#fefefe
| 477293 ||  || — || September 21, 2009 || Kitt Peak || Spacewatch || NYS || align=right data-sort-value="0.52" | 520 m || 
|-id=294 bgcolor=#fefefe
| 477294 ||  || — || September 21, 2009 || Kitt Peak || Spacewatch || — || align=right data-sort-value="0.85" | 850 m || 
|-id=295 bgcolor=#fefefe
| 477295 ||  || — || September 18, 2009 || Kitt Peak || Spacewatch || (2076) || align=right data-sort-value="0.83" | 830 m || 
|-id=296 bgcolor=#fefefe
| 477296 ||  || — || September 22, 2009 || Kitt Peak || Spacewatch || — || align=right data-sort-value="0.84" | 840 m || 
|-id=297 bgcolor=#fefefe
| 477297 ||  || — || September 22, 2009 || Kitt Peak || Spacewatch || — || align=right data-sort-value="0.52" | 520 m || 
|-id=298 bgcolor=#fefefe
| 477298 ||  || — || September 22, 2009 || Kitt Peak || Spacewatch || NYS || align=right data-sort-value="0.48" | 480 m || 
|-id=299 bgcolor=#fefefe
| 477299 ||  || — || March 8, 2008 || Mount Lemmon || Mount Lemmon Survey || NYS || align=right data-sort-value="0.64" | 640 m || 
|-id=300 bgcolor=#fefefe
| 477300 ||  || — || September 22, 2009 || Kitt Peak || Spacewatch || — || align=right data-sort-value="0.51" | 510 m || 
|}

477301–477400 

|-bgcolor=#fefefe
| 477301 ||  || — || September 22, 2009 || Kitt Peak || Spacewatch || (2076) || align=right data-sort-value="0.71" | 710 m || 
|-id=302 bgcolor=#fefefe
| 477302 ||  || — || September 23, 2009 || Kitt Peak || Spacewatch || — || align=right data-sort-value="0.65" | 650 m || 
|-id=303 bgcolor=#fefefe
| 477303 ||  || — || September 16, 2009 || Kitt Peak || Spacewatch || — || align=right data-sort-value="0.80" | 800 m || 
|-id=304 bgcolor=#fefefe
| 477304 ||  || — || September 16, 2009 || Kitt Peak || Spacewatch || — || align=right data-sort-value="0.78" | 780 m || 
|-id=305 bgcolor=#fefefe
| 477305 ||  || — || September 23, 2009 || Kitt Peak || Spacewatch || — || align=right data-sort-value="0.78" | 780 m || 
|-id=306 bgcolor=#fefefe
| 477306 ||  || — || April 12, 2005 || Kitt Peak || Spacewatch || — || align=right data-sort-value="0.68" | 680 m || 
|-id=307 bgcolor=#fefefe
| 477307 ||  || — || September 25, 2009 || Kitt Peak || Spacewatch || — || align=right data-sort-value="0.64" | 640 m || 
|-id=308 bgcolor=#fefefe
| 477308 ||  || — || December 15, 2006 || Kitt Peak || Spacewatch || — || align=right data-sort-value="0.67" | 670 m || 
|-id=309 bgcolor=#fefefe
| 477309 ||  || — || September 25, 2009 || Kitt Peak || Spacewatch || NYS || align=right data-sort-value="0.40" | 400 m || 
|-id=310 bgcolor=#fefefe
| 477310 ||  || — || January 27, 2007 || Kitt Peak || Spacewatch || MAS || align=right data-sort-value="0.59" | 590 m || 
|-id=311 bgcolor=#fefefe
| 477311 ||  || — || September 16, 2009 || Kitt Peak || Spacewatch || — || align=right data-sort-value="0.68" | 680 m || 
|-id=312 bgcolor=#fefefe
| 477312 ||  || — || September 17, 2009 || Kitt Peak || Spacewatch || — || align=right data-sort-value="0.61" | 610 m || 
|-id=313 bgcolor=#fefefe
| 477313 ||  || — || January 25, 2007 || Kitt Peak || Spacewatch || — || align=right data-sort-value="0.49" | 490 m || 
|-id=314 bgcolor=#fefefe
| 477314 ||  || — || September 26, 2009 || Kitt Peak || Spacewatch || — || align=right data-sort-value="0.76" | 760 m || 
|-id=315 bgcolor=#fefefe
| 477315 ||  || — || September 25, 2009 || Mount Lemmon || Mount Lemmon Survey || — || align=right data-sort-value="0.71" | 710 m || 
|-id=316 bgcolor=#fefefe
| 477316 ||  || — || September 16, 2009 || Kitt Peak || Spacewatch || — || align=right data-sort-value="0.68" | 680 m || 
|-id=317 bgcolor=#fefefe
| 477317 ||  || — || September 16, 2009 || Mount Lemmon || Mount Lemmon Survey || — || align=right data-sort-value="0.62" | 620 m || 
|-id=318 bgcolor=#fefefe
| 477318 ||  || — || September 19, 2009 || Catalina || CSS || — || align=right data-sort-value="0.60" | 600 m || 
|-id=319 bgcolor=#fefefe
| 477319 ||  || — || September 28, 2009 || Mount Lemmon || Mount Lemmon Survey || — || align=right data-sort-value="0.58" | 580 m || 
|-id=320 bgcolor=#fefefe
| 477320 ||  || — || September 19, 2009 || Kitt Peak || Spacewatch || — || align=right data-sort-value="0.82" | 820 m || 
|-id=321 bgcolor=#fefefe
| 477321 ||  || — || September 20, 2009 || Kitt Peak || Spacewatch || — || align=right | 1.9 km || 
|-id=322 bgcolor=#fefefe
| 477322 ||  || — || September 28, 2009 || Kitt Peak || Spacewatch || — || align=right data-sort-value="0.59" | 590 m || 
|-id=323 bgcolor=#fefefe
| 477323 ||  || — || October 2, 2009 || Mount Lemmon || Mount Lemmon Survey || — || align=right | 1.7 km || 
|-id=324 bgcolor=#fefefe
| 477324 ||  || — || September 19, 2009 || Kitt Peak || Spacewatch || — || align=right data-sort-value="0.80" | 800 m || 
|-id=325 bgcolor=#fefefe
| 477325 ||  || — || September 28, 2009 || Kitt Peak || Spacewatch || — || align=right data-sort-value="0.56" | 560 m || 
|-id=326 bgcolor=#FA8072
| 477326 ||  || — || October 13, 2009 || La Sagra || OAM Obs. || — || align=right data-sort-value="0.82" | 820 m || 
|-id=327 bgcolor=#FFC2E0
| 477327 ||  || — || October 14, 2009 || Mount Lemmon || Mount Lemmon Survey || APOcritical || align=right data-sort-value="0.78" | 780 m || 
|-id=328 bgcolor=#fefefe
| 477328 ||  || — || October 11, 2009 || Mount Lemmon || Mount Lemmon Survey || — || align=right data-sort-value="0.58" | 580 m || 
|-id=329 bgcolor=#fefefe
| 477329 ||  || — || October 11, 2009 || La Sagra || OAM Obs. || — || align=right data-sort-value="0.84" | 840 m || 
|-id=330 bgcolor=#FA8072
| 477330 ||  || — || September 28, 2009 || Kitt Peak || Spacewatch || — || align=right data-sort-value="0.51" | 510 m || 
|-id=331 bgcolor=#fefefe
| 477331 ||  || — || August 29, 2009 || Kitt Peak || Spacewatch || NYS || align=right data-sort-value="0.66" | 660 m || 
|-id=332 bgcolor=#fefefe
| 477332 ||  || — || September 25, 2009 || Kitt Peak || Spacewatch || — || align=right data-sort-value="0.71" | 710 m || 
|-id=333 bgcolor=#fefefe
| 477333 ||  || — || October 15, 2009 || Mount Lemmon || Mount Lemmon Survey || — || align=right data-sort-value="0.74" | 740 m || 
|-id=334 bgcolor=#fefefe
| 477334 ||  || — || October 15, 2009 || Mount Lemmon || Mount Lemmon Survey || — || align=right data-sort-value="0.67" | 670 m || 
|-id=335 bgcolor=#fefefe
| 477335 ||  || — || October 14, 2009 || Mount Lemmon || Mount Lemmon Survey || — || align=right data-sort-value="0.53" | 530 m || 
|-id=336 bgcolor=#fefefe
| 477336 ||  || — || October 14, 2009 || Mount Lemmon || Mount Lemmon Survey || — || align=right | 1.5 km || 
|-id=337 bgcolor=#fefefe
| 477337 ||  || — || October 12, 2009 || Mount Lemmon || Mount Lemmon Survey || — || align=right data-sort-value="0.83" | 830 m || 
|-id=338 bgcolor=#fefefe
| 477338 ||  || — || October 18, 2009 || Taunus || S. Karge, R. Kling || — || align=right | 1.5 km || 
|-id=339 bgcolor=#fefefe
| 477339 ||  || — || September 19, 2009 || Mount Lemmon || Mount Lemmon Survey || — || align=right data-sort-value="0.80" | 800 m || 
|-id=340 bgcolor=#fefefe
| 477340 ||  || — || October 17, 2009 || Catalina || CSS || — || align=right data-sort-value="0.72" | 720 m || 
|-id=341 bgcolor=#fefefe
| 477341 ||  || — || September 14, 2009 || Catalina || CSS || — || align=right data-sort-value="0.76" | 760 m || 
|-id=342 bgcolor=#fefefe
| 477342 ||  || — || October 23, 2009 || Mayhill || A. Lowe || — || align=right data-sort-value="0.64" | 640 m || 
|-id=343 bgcolor=#fefefe
| 477343 ||  || — || October 21, 2009 || Catalina || CSS || V || align=right data-sort-value="0.57" | 570 m || 
|-id=344 bgcolor=#fefefe
| 477344 ||  || — || October 18, 2009 || Mount Lemmon || Mount Lemmon Survey || MAS || align=right data-sort-value="0.63" | 630 m || 
|-id=345 bgcolor=#fefefe
| 477345 ||  || — || October 18, 2009 || Mount Lemmon || Mount Lemmon Survey || — || align=right data-sort-value="0.85" | 850 m || 
|-id=346 bgcolor=#fefefe
| 477346 ||  || — || October 22, 2009 || Mount Lemmon || Mount Lemmon Survey || V || align=right data-sort-value="0.64" | 640 m || 
|-id=347 bgcolor=#fefefe
| 477347 ||  || — || October 22, 2009 || Mount Lemmon || Mount Lemmon Survey || — || align=right data-sort-value="0.67" | 670 m || 
|-id=348 bgcolor=#fefefe
| 477348 ||  || — || October 22, 2009 || Mount Lemmon || Mount Lemmon Survey || — || align=right data-sort-value="0.73" | 730 m || 
|-id=349 bgcolor=#fefefe
| 477349 ||  || — || October 22, 2009 || Mount Lemmon || Mount Lemmon Survey || — || align=right data-sort-value="0.69" | 690 m || 
|-id=350 bgcolor=#fefefe
| 477350 ||  || — || January 17, 2007 || Kitt Peak || Spacewatch || — || align=right data-sort-value="0.68" | 680 m || 
|-id=351 bgcolor=#fefefe
| 477351 ||  || — || November 27, 2006 || Mount Lemmon || Mount Lemmon Survey || — || align=right data-sort-value="0.63" | 630 m || 
|-id=352 bgcolor=#fefefe
| 477352 ||  || — || October 18, 2009 || La Cañada || J. Lacruz || — || align=right data-sort-value="0.90" | 900 m || 
|-id=353 bgcolor=#fefefe
| 477353 ||  || — || October 18, 2009 || Mount Lemmon || Mount Lemmon Survey || V || align=right data-sort-value="0.59" | 590 m || 
|-id=354 bgcolor=#fefefe
| 477354 ||  || — || September 18, 2009 || Kitt Peak || Spacewatch || — || align=right data-sort-value="0.69" | 690 m || 
|-id=355 bgcolor=#fefefe
| 477355 ||  || — || October 22, 2009 || Mount Lemmon || Mount Lemmon Survey || — || align=right data-sort-value="0.66" | 660 m || 
|-id=356 bgcolor=#fefefe
| 477356 ||  || — || March 12, 2007 || Mount Lemmon || Mount Lemmon Survey || MAS || align=right data-sort-value="0.60" | 600 m || 
|-id=357 bgcolor=#fefefe
| 477357 ||  || — || October 24, 2009 || Catalina || CSS || — || align=right data-sort-value="0.69" | 690 m || 
|-id=358 bgcolor=#fefefe
| 477358 ||  || — || October 23, 2009 || Marly || P. Kocher || — || align=right data-sort-value="0.73" | 730 m || 
|-id=359 bgcolor=#fefefe
| 477359 ||  || — || October 18, 2009 || La Sagra || OAM Obs. || — || align=right | 1.4 km || 
|-id=360 bgcolor=#fefefe
| 477360 ||  || — || February 6, 2007 || Kitt Peak || Spacewatch || — || align=right data-sort-value="0.73" | 730 m || 
|-id=361 bgcolor=#fefefe
| 477361 ||  || — || October 26, 2009 || Bisei SG Center || BATTeRS || NYS || align=right data-sort-value="0.49" | 490 m || 
|-id=362 bgcolor=#fefefe
| 477362 ||  || — || October 23, 2009 || Mount Lemmon || Mount Lemmon Survey || — || align=right data-sort-value="0.74" | 740 m || 
|-id=363 bgcolor=#fefefe
| 477363 ||  || — || October 23, 2009 || Mount Lemmon || Mount Lemmon Survey || NYS || align=right data-sort-value="0.51" | 510 m || 
|-id=364 bgcolor=#fefefe
| 477364 ||  || — || October 23, 2009 || Mount Lemmon || Mount Lemmon Survey || — || align=right data-sort-value="0.65" | 650 m || 
|-id=365 bgcolor=#fefefe
| 477365 ||  || — || October 25, 2009 || Mount Lemmon || Mount Lemmon Survey || — || align=right data-sort-value="0.73" | 730 m || 
|-id=366 bgcolor=#fefefe
| 477366 ||  || — || October 9, 2002 || Socorro || LINEAR || — || align=right data-sort-value="0.76" | 760 m || 
|-id=367 bgcolor=#fefefe
| 477367 ||  || — || October 22, 2009 || Mount Lemmon || Mount Lemmon Survey || — || align=right data-sort-value="0.78" | 780 m || 
|-id=368 bgcolor=#fefefe
| 477368 ||  || — || October 23, 2009 || Kitt Peak || Spacewatch || — || align=right data-sort-value="0.61" | 610 m || 
|-id=369 bgcolor=#fefefe
| 477369 ||  || — || September 20, 2009 || Kitt Peak || Spacewatch || — || align=right data-sort-value="0.69" | 690 m || 
|-id=370 bgcolor=#fefefe
| 477370 ||  || — || October 21, 2009 || Mount Lemmon || Mount Lemmon Survey || — || align=right data-sort-value="0.82" | 820 m || 
|-id=371 bgcolor=#fefefe
| 477371 ||  || — || March 27, 2008 || Mount Lemmon || Mount Lemmon Survey || MAS || align=right data-sort-value="0.54" | 540 m || 
|-id=372 bgcolor=#fefefe
| 477372 ||  || — || September 21, 2009 || Mount Lemmon || Mount Lemmon Survey || (2076) || align=right data-sort-value="0.79" | 790 m || 
|-id=373 bgcolor=#fefefe
| 477373 ||  || — || October 26, 2009 || Catalina || CSS || — || align=right data-sort-value="0.85" | 850 m || 
|-id=374 bgcolor=#fefefe
| 477374 ||  || — || October 22, 2009 || Catalina || CSS || — || align=right data-sort-value="0.85" | 850 m || 
|-id=375 bgcolor=#fefefe
| 477375 ||  || — || October 11, 1977 || Palomar || PLS || — || align=right data-sort-value="0.79" | 790 m || 
|-id=376 bgcolor=#fefefe
| 477376 ||  || — || October 16, 2009 || Mount Lemmon || Mount Lemmon Survey || — || align=right data-sort-value="0.89" | 890 m || 
|-id=377 bgcolor=#fefefe
| 477377 ||  || — || October 26, 2009 || Kitt Peak || Spacewatch || MAS || align=right data-sort-value="0.47" | 470 m || 
|-id=378 bgcolor=#fefefe
| 477378 ||  || — || October 26, 2009 || Kitt Peak || Spacewatch || — || align=right data-sort-value="0.64" | 640 m || 
|-id=379 bgcolor=#fefefe
| 477379 ||  || — || October 1, 2009 || Mount Lemmon || Mount Lemmon Survey || — || align=right data-sort-value="0.94" | 940 m || 
|-id=380 bgcolor=#fefefe
| 477380 ||  || — || September 21, 2009 || Mount Lemmon || Mount Lemmon Survey || NYS || align=right data-sort-value="0.56" | 560 m || 
|-id=381 bgcolor=#fefefe
| 477381 ||  || — || October 18, 2009 || Mount Lemmon || Mount Lemmon Survey || — || align=right | 1.4 km || 
|-id=382 bgcolor=#fefefe
| 477382 ||  || — || November 9, 2009 || Kitt Peak || Spacewatch || — || align=right data-sort-value="0.53" | 530 m || 
|-id=383 bgcolor=#fefefe
| 477383 ||  || — || November 9, 2009 || Kitt Peak || Spacewatch || — || align=right data-sort-value="0.78" | 780 m || 
|-id=384 bgcolor=#fefefe
| 477384 ||  || — || November 9, 2009 || Mount Lemmon || Mount Lemmon Survey || — || align=right data-sort-value="0.68" | 680 m || 
|-id=385 bgcolor=#fefefe
| 477385 ||  || — || November 10, 2009 || Nogales || I. Robbins || — || align=right data-sort-value="0.60" | 600 m || 
|-id=386 bgcolor=#FA8072
| 477386 ||  || — || October 26, 2009 || Kitt Peak || Spacewatch || — || align=right data-sort-value="0.58" | 580 m || 
|-id=387 bgcolor=#fefefe
| 477387 ||  || — || November 8, 2009 || Kitt Peak || Spacewatch || — || align=right data-sort-value="0.76" | 760 m || 
|-id=388 bgcolor=#fefefe
| 477388 ||  || — || September 21, 2009 || Mount Lemmon || Mount Lemmon Survey || — || align=right | 1.5 km || 
|-id=389 bgcolor=#fefefe
| 477389 ||  || — || October 23, 2009 || Kitt Peak || Spacewatch || — || align=right data-sort-value="0.91" | 910 m || 
|-id=390 bgcolor=#fefefe
| 477390 ||  || — || November 9, 2009 || Mount Lemmon || Mount Lemmon Survey || — || align=right data-sort-value="0.66" | 660 m || 
|-id=391 bgcolor=#fefefe
| 477391 ||  || — || November 8, 2009 || Catalina || CSS || NYS || align=right data-sort-value="0.55" | 550 m || 
|-id=392 bgcolor=#fefefe
| 477392 ||  || — || November 9, 2009 || Kitt Peak || Spacewatch || MAS || align=right data-sort-value="0.54" | 540 m || 
|-id=393 bgcolor=#fefefe
| 477393 ||  || — || November 10, 2009 || Kitt Peak || Spacewatch || MAS || align=right data-sort-value="0.69" | 690 m || 
|-id=394 bgcolor=#fefefe
| 477394 ||  || — || November 11, 2009 || Socorro || LINEAR || — || align=right data-sort-value="0.90" | 900 m || 
|-id=395 bgcolor=#fefefe
| 477395 ||  || — || November 9, 2009 || Kitt Peak || Spacewatch || — || align=right data-sort-value="0.52" | 520 m || 
|-id=396 bgcolor=#fefefe
| 477396 ||  || — || November 11, 2009 || Kitt Peak || Spacewatch || — || align=right data-sort-value="0.62" | 620 m || 
|-id=397 bgcolor=#fefefe
| 477397 ||  || — || November 15, 2009 || Catalina || CSS || — || align=right data-sort-value="0.96" | 960 m || 
|-id=398 bgcolor=#fefefe
| 477398 ||  || — || September 29, 2005 || Mount Lemmon || Mount Lemmon Survey || — || align=right data-sort-value="0.74" | 740 m || 
|-id=399 bgcolor=#fefefe
| 477399 ||  || — || November 11, 2009 || Socorro || LINEAR || — || align=right | 1.1 km || 
|-id=400 bgcolor=#fefefe
| 477400 ||  || — || November 15, 2009 || Catalina || CSS || — || align=right data-sort-value="0.71" | 710 m || 
|}

477401–477500 

|-bgcolor=#fefefe
| 477401 ||  || — || November 8, 2009 || Catalina || CSS || — || align=right data-sort-value="0.67" | 670 m || 
|-id=402 bgcolor=#fefefe
| 477402 ||  || — || November 9, 2009 || Catalina || CSS || — || align=right data-sort-value="0.68" | 680 m || 
|-id=403 bgcolor=#fefefe
| 477403 ||  || — || November 9, 2009 || Catalina || CSS || — || align=right data-sort-value="0.84" | 840 m || 
|-id=404 bgcolor=#fefefe
| 477404 ||  || — || October 27, 2009 || Kitt Peak || Spacewatch || — || align=right data-sort-value="0.48" | 480 m || 
|-id=405 bgcolor=#fefefe
| 477405 ||  || — || October 22, 2009 || Mount Lemmon || Mount Lemmon Survey || — || align=right data-sort-value="0.83" | 830 m || 
|-id=406 bgcolor=#fefefe
| 477406 ||  || — || November 9, 2009 || Kitt Peak || Spacewatch || — || align=right data-sort-value="0.69" | 690 m || 
|-id=407 bgcolor=#fefefe
| 477407 ||  || — || November 9, 2009 || Mount Lemmon || Mount Lemmon Survey || NYS || align=right data-sort-value="0.66" | 660 m || 
|-id=408 bgcolor=#fefefe
| 477408 ||  || — || November 10, 2009 || Catalina || CSS || — || align=right data-sort-value="0.87" | 870 m || 
|-id=409 bgcolor=#fefefe
| 477409 ||  || — || November 9, 2009 || Kitt Peak || Spacewatch || NYS || align=right data-sort-value="0.56" | 560 m || 
|-id=410 bgcolor=#fefefe
| 477410 ||  || — || November 10, 2009 || Kitt Peak || Spacewatch || — || align=right data-sort-value="0.71" | 710 m || 
|-id=411 bgcolor=#fefefe
| 477411 ||  || — || September 18, 2009 || Mount Lemmon || Mount Lemmon Survey || — || align=right data-sort-value="0.62" | 620 m || 
|-id=412 bgcolor=#fefefe
| 477412 ||  || — || November 9, 2009 || Kitt Peak || Spacewatch || — || align=right | 1.8 km || 
|-id=413 bgcolor=#fefefe
| 477413 ||  || — || October 5, 2005 || Kitt Peak || Spacewatch || — || align=right data-sort-value="0.63" | 630 m || 
|-id=414 bgcolor=#fefefe
| 477414 ||  || — || October 14, 2009 || Mount Lemmon || Mount Lemmon Survey || — || align=right data-sort-value="0.80" | 800 m || 
|-id=415 bgcolor=#fefefe
| 477415 ||  || — || November 11, 2009 || Mount Lemmon || Mount Lemmon Survey || NYS || align=right data-sort-value="0.49" | 490 m || 
|-id=416 bgcolor=#fefefe
| 477416 ||  || — || December 23, 2006 || Mount Lemmon || Mount Lemmon Survey || MAS || align=right data-sort-value="0.74" | 740 m || 
|-id=417 bgcolor=#fefefe
| 477417 ||  || — || November 16, 2009 || Mount Lemmon || Mount Lemmon Survey || — || align=right data-sort-value="0.81" | 810 m || 
|-id=418 bgcolor=#fefefe
| 477418 ||  || — || November 16, 2009 || La Sagra || OAM Obs. || — || align=right data-sort-value="0.98" | 980 m || 
|-id=419 bgcolor=#fefefe
| 477419 ||  || — || November 17, 2009 || Kitt Peak || Spacewatch || NYS || align=right data-sort-value="0.55" | 550 m || 
|-id=420 bgcolor=#fefefe
| 477420 ||  || — || September 30, 2009 || Mount Lemmon || Mount Lemmon Survey || V || align=right data-sort-value="0.69" | 690 m || 
|-id=421 bgcolor=#fefefe
| 477421 ||  || — || November 18, 2009 || Kitt Peak || Spacewatch || — || align=right data-sort-value="0.81" | 810 m || 
|-id=422 bgcolor=#fefefe
| 477422 ||  || — || November 19, 2009 || Kitt Peak || Spacewatch || — || align=right data-sort-value="0.65" | 650 m || 
|-id=423 bgcolor=#fefefe
| 477423 ||  || — || February 17, 2007 || Kitt Peak || Spacewatch || — || align=right | 1.6 km || 
|-id=424 bgcolor=#fefefe
| 477424 ||  || — || March 15, 2007 || Mount Lemmon || Mount Lemmon Survey || — || align=right data-sort-value="0.54" | 540 m || 
|-id=425 bgcolor=#fefefe
| 477425 ||  || — || November 18, 2009 || Mount Lemmon || Mount Lemmon Survey || — || align=right data-sort-value="0.60" | 600 m || 
|-id=426 bgcolor=#fefefe
| 477426 ||  || — || November 18, 2009 || Kitt Peak || Spacewatch || — || align=right data-sort-value="0.78" | 780 m || 
|-id=427 bgcolor=#fefefe
| 477427 ||  || — || September 29, 2005 || Mount Lemmon || Mount Lemmon Survey || NYS || align=right data-sort-value="0.62" | 620 m || 
|-id=428 bgcolor=#fefefe
| 477428 ||  || — || November 19, 2009 || Kitt Peak || Spacewatch || — || align=right data-sort-value="0.79" | 790 m || 
|-id=429 bgcolor=#fefefe
| 477429 ||  || — || November 20, 2009 || Mount Lemmon || Mount Lemmon Survey || NYS || align=right data-sort-value="0.59" | 590 m || 
|-id=430 bgcolor=#fefefe
| 477430 ||  || — || November 20, 2009 || Kitt Peak || Spacewatch || MAS || align=right data-sort-value="0.67" | 670 m || 
|-id=431 bgcolor=#d6d6d6
| 477431 ||  || — || September 20, 2009 || Mount Lemmon || Mount Lemmon Survey || 3:2 || align=right | 4.3 km || 
|-id=432 bgcolor=#fefefe
| 477432 ||  || — || November 8, 2009 || Kitt Peak || Spacewatch || — || align=right data-sort-value="0.81" | 810 m || 
|-id=433 bgcolor=#fefefe
| 477433 ||  || — || October 26, 2009 || Kitt Peak || Spacewatch || — || align=right data-sort-value="0.85" | 850 m || 
|-id=434 bgcolor=#fefefe
| 477434 ||  || — || November 23, 2009 || Catalina || CSS || — || align=right data-sort-value="0.65" | 650 m || 
|-id=435 bgcolor=#fefefe
| 477435 ||  || — || November 20, 2009 || Kitt Peak || Spacewatch || — || align=right data-sort-value="0.58" | 580 m || 
|-id=436 bgcolor=#fefefe
| 477436 ||  || — || October 12, 2009 || Mount Lemmon || Mount Lemmon Survey || — || align=right data-sort-value="0.78" | 780 m || 
|-id=437 bgcolor=#fefefe
| 477437 ||  || — || September 15, 2009 || Kitt Peak || Spacewatch || — || align=right | 1.0 km || 
|-id=438 bgcolor=#fefefe
| 477438 ||  || — || September 1, 2005 || Kitt Peak || Spacewatch || — || align=right | 1.9 km || 
|-id=439 bgcolor=#fefefe
| 477439 ||  || — || November 21, 2009 || Kitt Peak || Spacewatch || — || align=right data-sort-value="0.80" | 800 m || 
|-id=440 bgcolor=#fefefe
| 477440 ||  || — || November 21, 2009 || Kitt Peak || Spacewatch || — || align=right | 2.2 km || 
|-id=441 bgcolor=#fefefe
| 477441 ||  || — || November 22, 2009 || Kitt Peak || Spacewatch || MAS || align=right data-sort-value="0.65" | 650 m || 
|-id=442 bgcolor=#fefefe
| 477442 ||  || — || November 22, 2009 || Kitt Peak || Spacewatch || — || align=right data-sort-value="0.78" | 780 m || 
|-id=443 bgcolor=#fefefe
| 477443 ||  || — || July 9, 2005 || Kitt Peak || Spacewatch || — || align=right data-sort-value="0.71" | 710 m || 
|-id=444 bgcolor=#fefefe
| 477444 ||  || — || October 26, 2009 || Kitt Peak || Spacewatch || — || align=right data-sort-value="0.66" | 660 m || 
|-id=445 bgcolor=#fefefe
| 477445 ||  || — || November 11, 2009 || Kitt Peak || Spacewatch || — || align=right | 1.0 km || 
|-id=446 bgcolor=#d6d6d6
| 477446 ||  || — || November 10, 2009 || Kitt Peak || Spacewatch || 3:2 || align=right | 4.8 km || 
|-id=447 bgcolor=#fefefe
| 477447 ||  || — || October 24, 2009 || Kitt Peak || Spacewatch || V || align=right data-sort-value="0.52" | 520 m || 
|-id=448 bgcolor=#fefefe
| 477448 ||  || — || November 25, 2009 || Mount Lemmon || Mount Lemmon Survey || — || align=right data-sort-value="0.87" | 870 m || 
|-id=449 bgcolor=#d6d6d6
| 477449 ||  || — || October 21, 2009 || Mount Lemmon || Mount Lemmon Survey || 3:2 || align=right | 3.5 km || 
|-id=450 bgcolor=#fefefe
| 477450 ||  || — || August 17, 2009 || Kitt Peak || Spacewatch || NYS || align=right data-sort-value="0.67" | 670 m || 
|-id=451 bgcolor=#fefefe
| 477451 ||  || — || November 9, 2009 || Kitt Peak || Spacewatch || — || align=right data-sort-value="0.75" | 750 m || 
|-id=452 bgcolor=#fefefe
| 477452 ||  || — || November 20, 2009 || Kitt Peak || Spacewatch || MAS || align=right data-sort-value="0.55" | 550 m || 
|-id=453 bgcolor=#fefefe
| 477453 ||  || — || November 18, 2009 || La Silla || La Silla Obs. || — || align=right data-sort-value="0.82" | 820 m || 
|-id=454 bgcolor=#d6d6d6
| 477454 ||  || — || November 17, 2009 || Mount Lemmon || Mount Lemmon Survey || SHU3:2 || align=right | 5.3 km || 
|-id=455 bgcolor=#fefefe
| 477455 ||  || — || November 17, 2009 || Mount Lemmon || Mount Lemmon Survey || MAS || align=right data-sort-value="0.63" | 630 m || 
|-id=456 bgcolor=#fefefe
| 477456 ||  || — || November 17, 2009 || Mount Lemmon || Mount Lemmon Survey || — || align=right data-sort-value="0.73" | 730 m || 
|-id=457 bgcolor=#fefefe
| 477457 ||  || — || September 19, 2009 || Mount Lemmon || Mount Lemmon Survey || NYS || align=right data-sort-value="0.51" | 510 m || 
|-id=458 bgcolor=#fefefe
| 477458 ||  || — || November 19, 2009 || Kitt Peak || Spacewatch || — || align=right data-sort-value="0.67" | 670 m || 
|-id=459 bgcolor=#fefefe
| 477459 ||  || — || November 17, 2009 || Catalina || CSS || — || align=right data-sort-value="0.97" | 970 m || 
|-id=460 bgcolor=#d6d6d6
| 477460 ||  || — || November 27, 2009 || Mount Lemmon || Mount Lemmon Survey || 3:2 || align=right | 6.3 km || 
|-id=461 bgcolor=#d6d6d6
| 477461 ||  || — || September 22, 2009 || Mount Lemmon || Mount Lemmon Survey || 3:2 || align=right | 3.9 km || 
|-id=462 bgcolor=#d6d6d6
| 477462 ||  || — || November 17, 2009 || Mount Lemmon || Mount Lemmon Survey || 3:2 || align=right | 4.1 km || 
|-id=463 bgcolor=#fefefe
| 477463 ||  || — || November 19, 2009 || Mount Lemmon || Mount Lemmon Survey || — || align=right | 1.0 km || 
|-id=464 bgcolor=#fefefe
| 477464 ||  || — || December 8, 2009 || San Marcello || Pistoia Mountains Obs. || NYS || align=right data-sort-value="0.60" | 600 m || 
|-id=465 bgcolor=#FFC2E0
| 477465 ||  || — || December 11, 2009 || Catalina || CSS || ATEPHA || align=right data-sort-value="0.16" | 160 m || 
|-id=466 bgcolor=#fefefe
| 477466 ||  || — || December 15, 2009 || Mount Lemmon || Mount Lemmon Survey || — || align=right data-sort-value="0.66" | 660 m || 
|-id=467 bgcolor=#E9E9E9
| 477467 ||  || — || December 15, 2009 || Mount Lemmon || Mount Lemmon Survey || — || align=right | 1.6 km || 
|-id=468 bgcolor=#fefefe
| 477468 ||  || — || September 29, 2005 || Mount Lemmon || Mount Lemmon Survey || MAS || align=right data-sort-value="0.55" | 550 m || 
|-id=469 bgcolor=#fefefe
| 477469 ||  || — || December 17, 2009 || Mount Lemmon || Mount Lemmon Survey || NYS || align=right data-sort-value="0.60" | 600 m || 
|-id=470 bgcolor=#fefefe
| 477470 ||  || — || December 16, 2009 || Kitt Peak || Spacewatch || NYS || align=right data-sort-value="0.53" | 530 m || 
|-id=471 bgcolor=#fefefe
| 477471 ||  || — || January 7, 2010 || Bisei SG Center || BATTeRS || — || align=right data-sort-value="0.88" | 880 m || 
|-id=472 bgcolor=#fefefe
| 477472 ||  || — || January 5, 2010 || Kitt Peak || Spacewatch || NYS || align=right data-sort-value="0.66" | 660 m || 
|-id=473 bgcolor=#fefefe
| 477473 ||  || — || January 6, 2010 || Catalina || CSS || — || align=right | 1.8 km || 
|-id=474 bgcolor=#fefefe
| 477474 ||  || — || October 30, 2005 || Kitt Peak || Spacewatch || — || align=right data-sort-value="0.68" | 680 m || 
|-id=475 bgcolor=#fefefe
| 477475 ||  || — || January 6, 2010 || Catalina || CSS || — || align=right | 1.2 km || 
|-id=476 bgcolor=#d6d6d6
| 477476 ||  || — || January 7, 2010 || Mount Lemmon || Mount Lemmon Survey || 3:2 || align=right | 4.3 km || 
|-id=477 bgcolor=#E9E9E9
| 477477 ||  || — || January 6, 2010 || Kitt Peak || Spacewatch || (194) || align=right | 2.3 km || 
|-id=478 bgcolor=#fefefe
| 477478 ||  || — || January 7, 2010 || Kitt Peak || Spacewatch || NYS || align=right data-sort-value="0.51" | 510 m || 
|-id=479 bgcolor=#fefefe
| 477479 ||  || — || January 7, 2010 || Kitt Peak || Spacewatch || — || align=right data-sort-value="0.98" | 980 m || 
|-id=480 bgcolor=#fefefe
| 477480 ||  || — || January 6, 2010 || Mount Lemmon || Mount Lemmon Survey || — || align=right data-sort-value="0.61" | 610 m || 
|-id=481 bgcolor=#E9E9E9
| 477481 ||  || — || January 12, 2010 || Kitt Peak || Spacewatch || EUN || align=right | 1.3 km || 
|-id=482 bgcolor=#d6d6d6
| 477482 ||  || — || January 15, 2010 || WISE || WISE || — || align=right | 4.0 km || 
|-id=483 bgcolor=#E9E9E9
| 477483 ||  || — || January 14, 2010 || WISE || WISE || — || align=right | 3.2 km || 
|-id=484 bgcolor=#E9E9E9
| 477484 ||  || — || January 18, 2010 || Dauban || F. Kugel || — || align=right | 2.0 km || 
|-id=485 bgcolor=#fefefe
| 477485 ||  || — || November 1, 2005 || Mount Lemmon || Mount Lemmon Survey || NYS || align=right data-sort-value="0.53" | 530 m || 
|-id=486 bgcolor=#E9E9E9
| 477486 ||  || — || May 22, 2006 || Kitt Peak || Spacewatch || — || align=right | 3.5 km || 
|-id=487 bgcolor=#E9E9E9
| 477487 ||  || — || December 21, 2004 || Catalina || CSS || — || align=right | 3.5 km || 
|-id=488 bgcolor=#fefefe
| 477488 ||  || — || February 5, 2010 || Catalina || CSS || — || align=right data-sort-value="0.72" | 720 m || 
|-id=489 bgcolor=#E9E9E9
| 477489 ||  || — || February 9, 2010 || WISE || WISE || — || align=right | 2.9 km || 
|-id=490 bgcolor=#FFC2E0
| 477490 ||  || — || January 19, 2010 || WISE || WISE || AMO || align=right data-sort-value="0.65" | 650 m || 
|-id=491 bgcolor=#FFC2E0
| 477491 ||  || — || February 14, 2010 || Catalina || CSS || APO +1km || align=right data-sort-value="0.74" | 740 m || 
|-id=492 bgcolor=#FFC2E0
| 477492 ||  || — || February 14, 2010 || Socorro || LINEAR || AMO || align=right data-sort-value="0.46" | 460 m || 
|-id=493 bgcolor=#E9E9E9
| 477493 ||  || — || February 9, 2010 || Mount Lemmon || Mount Lemmon Survey || — || align=right | 1.6 km || 
|-id=494 bgcolor=#E9E9E9
| 477494 ||  || — || January 8, 2010 || Mount Lemmon || Mount Lemmon Survey || EUN || align=right | 1.2 km || 
|-id=495 bgcolor=#E9E9E9
| 477495 ||  || — || November 15, 2009 || Mount Lemmon || Mount Lemmon Survey || EUN || align=right | 1.9 km || 
|-id=496 bgcolor=#E9E9E9
| 477496 ||  || — || February 9, 2010 || Kitt Peak || Spacewatch || — || align=right | 1.7 km || 
|-id=497 bgcolor=#E9E9E9
| 477497 ||  || — || February 9, 2010 || Kitt Peak || Spacewatch || — || align=right | 2.0 km || 
|-id=498 bgcolor=#E9E9E9
| 477498 ||  || — || February 13, 2010 || Mount Lemmon || Mount Lemmon Survey || — || align=right data-sort-value="0.82" | 820 m || 
|-id=499 bgcolor=#E9E9E9
| 477499 ||  || — || February 13, 2010 || Mount Lemmon || Mount Lemmon Survey || ADE || align=right | 1.7 km || 
|-id=500 bgcolor=#E9E9E9
| 477500 ||  || — || December 20, 2009 || Mount Lemmon || Mount Lemmon Survey || — || align=right | 2.0 km || 
|}

477501–477600 

|-bgcolor=#E9E9E9
| 477501 ||  || — || February 14, 2010 || Mount Lemmon || Mount Lemmon Survey || — || align=right data-sort-value="0.90" | 900 m || 
|-id=502 bgcolor=#E9E9E9
| 477502 ||  || — || February 14, 2010 || Kitt Peak || Spacewatch || — || align=right | 1.1 km || 
|-id=503 bgcolor=#E9E9E9
| 477503 ||  || — || September 27, 2003 || Kitt Peak || Spacewatch || — || align=right | 1.5 km || 
|-id=504 bgcolor=#fefefe
| 477504 ||  || — || February 14, 2010 || Mount Lemmon || Mount Lemmon Survey || — || align=right data-sort-value="0.98" | 980 m || 
|-id=505 bgcolor=#E9E9E9
| 477505 ||  || — || February 14, 2010 || Mount Lemmon || Mount Lemmon Survey || — || align=right | 2.1 km || 
|-id=506 bgcolor=#fefefe
| 477506 ||  || — || February 6, 2010 || Mount Lemmon || Mount Lemmon Survey || H || align=right data-sort-value="0.60" | 600 m || 
|-id=507 bgcolor=#E9E9E9
| 477507 ||  || — || February 14, 2010 || Catalina || CSS || — || align=right | 1.3 km || 
|-id=508 bgcolor=#E9E9E9
| 477508 ||  || — || February 15, 2010 || WISE || WISE || — || align=right | 2.2 km || 
|-id=509 bgcolor=#E9E9E9
| 477509 ||  || — || February 15, 2010 || Catalina || CSS || — || align=right | 2.2 km || 
|-id=510 bgcolor=#fefefe
| 477510 ||  || — || February 13, 2010 || Catalina || CSS || — || align=right | 1.6 km || 
|-id=511 bgcolor=#E9E9E9
| 477511 ||  || — || October 6, 2008 || Mount Lemmon || Mount Lemmon Survey || — || align=right | 1.3 km || 
|-id=512 bgcolor=#E9E9E9
| 477512 ||  || — || February 15, 2010 || Kitt Peak || Spacewatch || — || align=right | 2.3 km || 
|-id=513 bgcolor=#fefefe
| 477513 ||  || — || February 5, 2010 || Catalina || CSS || — || align=right data-sort-value="0.90" | 900 m || 
|-id=514 bgcolor=#E9E9E9
| 477514 ||  || — || February 6, 2010 || Kitt Peak || Spacewatch || — || align=right data-sort-value="0.88" | 880 m || 
|-id=515 bgcolor=#E9E9E9
| 477515 ||  || — || February 9, 2010 || Kitt Peak || Spacewatch || — || align=right | 2.5 km || 
|-id=516 bgcolor=#E9E9E9
| 477516 ||  || — || February 7, 2010 || WISE || WISE || — || align=right | 1.8 km || 
|-id=517 bgcolor=#E9E9E9
| 477517 ||  || — || December 31, 2008 || Kitt Peak || Spacewatch || — || align=right | 2.1 km || 
|-id=518 bgcolor=#E9E9E9
| 477518 ||  || — || February 17, 2010 || Kitt Peak || Spacewatch || — || align=right | 2.1 km || 
|-id=519 bgcolor=#FFC2E0
| 477519 ||  || — || February 23, 2010 || WISE || WISE || APOPHA || align=right data-sort-value="0.32" | 320 m || 
|-id=520 bgcolor=#E9E9E9
| 477520 ||  || — || February 26, 2010 || WISE || WISE || — || align=right | 3.5 km || 
|-id=521 bgcolor=#E9E9E9
| 477521 ||  || — || February 16, 2010 || Haleakala || Pan-STARRS || EUN || align=right | 1.3 km || 
|-id=522 bgcolor=#fefefe
| 477522 ||  || — || January 20, 2006 || Kitt Peak || Spacewatch || NYS || align=right data-sort-value="0.67" | 670 m || 
|-id=523 bgcolor=#E9E9E9
| 477523 ||  || — || February 17, 2010 || Kitt Peak || Spacewatch || — || align=right | 1.9 km || 
|-id=524 bgcolor=#FFC2E0
| 477524 ||  || — || January 23, 2010 || WISE || WISE || AMO || align=right data-sort-value="0.99" | 990 m || 
|-id=525 bgcolor=#E9E9E9
| 477525 ||  || — || January 19, 2010 || WISE || WISE || — || align=right | 2.9 km || 
|-id=526 bgcolor=#E9E9E9
| 477526 ||  || — || March 13, 2010 || Catalina || CSS || — || align=right | 1.9 km || 
|-id=527 bgcolor=#E9E9E9
| 477527 ||  || — || March 4, 2010 || Kitt Peak || Spacewatch || — || align=right | 1.5 km || 
|-id=528 bgcolor=#E9E9E9
| 477528 ||  || — || March 13, 2010 || Kitt Peak || Spacewatch || — || align=right data-sort-value="0.78" | 780 m || 
|-id=529 bgcolor=#E9E9E9
| 477529 ||  || — || January 15, 2010 || WISE || WISE || — || align=right | 2.0 km || 
|-id=530 bgcolor=#E9E9E9
| 477530 ||  || — || March 13, 2010 || Mount Lemmon || Mount Lemmon Survey || JUN || align=right | 1.2 km || 
|-id=531 bgcolor=#E9E9E9
| 477531 ||  || — || March 14, 2010 || La Sagra || OAM Obs. || — || align=right | 2.7 km || 
|-id=532 bgcolor=#E9E9E9
| 477532 ||  || — || February 18, 2010 || Kitt Peak || Spacewatch || — || align=right | 2.2 km || 
|-id=533 bgcolor=#E9E9E9
| 477533 ||  || — || March 14, 2010 || Mount Lemmon || Mount Lemmon Survey || — || align=right | 1.5 km || 
|-id=534 bgcolor=#E9E9E9
| 477534 ||  || — || March 15, 2010 || Catalina || CSS || — || align=right | 2.9 km || 
|-id=535 bgcolor=#E9E9E9
| 477535 ||  || — || September 13, 2007 || Mount Lemmon || Mount Lemmon Survey || — || align=right | 1.2 km || 
|-id=536 bgcolor=#E9E9E9
| 477536 ||  || — || March 15, 2010 || Kitt Peak || Spacewatch || — || align=right | 2.3 km || 
|-id=537 bgcolor=#E9E9E9
| 477537 ||  || — || March 13, 2010 || Kitt Peak || Spacewatch || MAR || align=right data-sort-value="0.99" | 990 m || 
|-id=538 bgcolor=#fefefe
| 477538 ||  || — || March 12, 2010 || Catalina || CSS || H || align=right data-sort-value="0.68" | 680 m || 
|-id=539 bgcolor=#E9E9E9
| 477539 ||  || — || March 12, 2010 || Catalina || CSS || — || align=right | 2.8 km || 
|-id=540 bgcolor=#fefefe
| 477540 ||  || — || December 19, 2009 || Mount Lemmon || Mount Lemmon Survey || — || align=right | 1.2 km || 
|-id=541 bgcolor=#E9E9E9
| 477541 ||  || — || February 19, 2010 || Mount Lemmon || Mount Lemmon Survey || — || align=right | 1.6 km || 
|-id=542 bgcolor=#E9E9E9
| 477542 ||  || — || March 18, 2010 || Kitt Peak || Spacewatch || — || align=right | 1.5 km || 
|-id=543 bgcolor=#E9E9E9
| 477543 ||  || — || March 18, 2010 || Mount Lemmon || Mount Lemmon Survey || — || align=right | 2.0 km || 
|-id=544 bgcolor=#E9E9E9
| 477544 ||  || — || February 27, 2006 || Kitt Peak || Spacewatch || — || align=right | 1.3 km || 
|-id=545 bgcolor=#E9E9E9
| 477545 ||  || — || March 19, 2010 || Mount Lemmon || Mount Lemmon Survey || — || align=right | 1.7 km || 
|-id=546 bgcolor=#E9E9E9
| 477546 ||  || — || March 16, 2010 || Kitt Peak || Spacewatch || — || align=right | 2.0 km || 
|-id=547 bgcolor=#E9E9E9
| 477547 ||  || — || March 17, 2010 || Catalina || CSS || — || align=right | 2.2 km || 
|-id=548 bgcolor=#E9E9E9
| 477548 ||  || — || March 19, 2010 || Kitt Peak || Spacewatch || — || align=right | 1.0 km || 
|-id=549 bgcolor=#E9E9E9
| 477549 ||  || — || March 19, 2010 || Kitt Peak || Spacewatch || JUN || align=right | 1.1 km || 
|-id=550 bgcolor=#E9E9E9
| 477550 ||  || — || March 21, 2010 || Catalina || CSS || — || align=right | 2.2 km || 
|-id=551 bgcolor=#E9E9E9
| 477551 ||  || — || February 13, 2010 || Mount Lemmon || Mount Lemmon Survey || — || align=right | 2.9 km || 
|-id=552 bgcolor=#E9E9E9
| 477552 ||  || — || March 18, 2010 || Kitt Peak || Spacewatch || — || align=right | 2.2 km || 
|-id=553 bgcolor=#E9E9E9
| 477553 ||  || — || September 10, 2007 || Mount Lemmon || Mount Lemmon Survey || — || align=right | 1.3 km || 
|-id=554 bgcolor=#fefefe
| 477554 ||  || — || March 25, 2010 || Mount Lemmon || Mount Lemmon Survey || H || align=right data-sort-value="0.75" | 750 m || 
|-id=555 bgcolor=#E9E9E9
| 477555 ||  || — || April 5, 2010 || Catalina || CSS || — || align=right | 2.0 km || 
|-id=556 bgcolor=#E9E9E9
| 477556 ||  || — || March 16, 2010 || Mount Lemmon || Mount Lemmon Survey || — || align=right | 1.8 km || 
|-id=557 bgcolor=#E9E9E9
| 477557 ||  || — || March 18, 2010 || Kitt Peak || Spacewatch || — || align=right | 2.0 km || 
|-id=558 bgcolor=#E9E9E9
| 477558 ||  || — || October 28, 1994 || Kitt Peak || Spacewatch || — || align=right | 1.6 km || 
|-id=559 bgcolor=#fefefe
| 477559 ||  || — || April 8, 2010 || Kitt Peak || Spacewatch || H || align=right data-sort-value="0.68" | 680 m || 
|-id=560 bgcolor=#E9E9E9
| 477560 ||  || — || April 9, 2010 || Kitt Peak || Spacewatch || — || align=right | 2.3 km || 
|-id=561 bgcolor=#E9E9E9
| 477561 ||  || — || April 10, 2010 || Kitt Peak || Spacewatch || — || align=right | 1.3 km || 
|-id=562 bgcolor=#d6d6d6
| 477562 ||  || — || April 10, 2010 || Kitt Peak || Spacewatch || — || align=right | 2.0 km || 
|-id=563 bgcolor=#E9E9E9
| 477563 ||  || — || April 10, 2010 || Kitt Peak || Spacewatch || — || align=right data-sort-value="0.86" | 860 m || 
|-id=564 bgcolor=#E9E9E9
| 477564 ||  || — || December 30, 2000 || Socorro || LINEAR || (5) || align=right data-sort-value="0.95" | 950 m || 
|-id=565 bgcolor=#E9E9E9
| 477565 ||  || — || November 2, 2007 || Mount Lemmon || Mount Lemmon Survey || — || align=right | 2.3 km || 
|-id=566 bgcolor=#fefefe
| 477566 ||  || — || March 17, 2010 || Catalina || CSS || H || align=right data-sort-value="0.82" | 820 m || 
|-id=567 bgcolor=#E9E9E9
| 477567 ||  || — || April 26, 2006 || Mount Lemmon || Mount Lemmon Survey || — || align=right | 1.7 km || 
|-id=568 bgcolor=#E9E9E9
| 477568 ||  || — || January 8, 2010 || WISE || WISE || — || align=right | 2.1 km || 
|-id=569 bgcolor=#E9E9E9
| 477569 ||  || — || April 13, 2010 || Catalina || CSS || — || align=right | 1.8 km || 
|-id=570 bgcolor=#E9E9E9
| 477570 ||  || — || January 15, 2010 || WISE || WISE || — || align=right | 3.0 km || 
|-id=571 bgcolor=#d6d6d6
| 477571 ||  || — || April 23, 2010 || WISE || WISE || — || align=right | 3.4 km || 
|-id=572 bgcolor=#d6d6d6
| 477572 ||  || — || April 28, 2010 || WISE || WISE || — || align=right | 3.2 km || 
|-id=573 bgcolor=#E9E9E9
| 477573 ||  || — || October 14, 2007 || Kitt Peak || Spacewatch || — || align=right | 2.3 km || 
|-id=574 bgcolor=#E9E9E9
| 477574 ||  || — || October 30, 2007 || Kitt Peak || Spacewatch || — || align=right | 1.7 km || 
|-id=575 bgcolor=#E9E9E9
| 477575 ||  || — || October 18, 2007 || Kitt Peak || Spacewatch || AGN || align=right | 1.1 km || 
|-id=576 bgcolor=#E9E9E9
| 477576 ||  || — || November 3, 2007 || Kitt Peak || Spacewatch || — || align=right | 2.4 km || 
|-id=577 bgcolor=#E9E9E9
| 477577 ||  || — || March 21, 2010 || Kitt Peak || Spacewatch || MAR || align=right | 1.0 km || 
|-id=578 bgcolor=#E9E9E9
| 477578 ||  || — || October 29, 2003 || Kitt Peak || Spacewatch || — || align=right | 1.9 km || 
|-id=579 bgcolor=#fefefe
| 477579 ||  || — || April 11, 2010 || Mount Lemmon || Mount Lemmon Survey || H || align=right data-sort-value="0.64" | 640 m || 
|-id=580 bgcolor=#d6d6d6
| 477580 ||  || — || May 3, 2010 || WISE || WISE || Tj (2.98) || align=right | 3.3 km || 
|-id=581 bgcolor=#d6d6d6
| 477581 ||  || — || May 3, 2010 || WISE || WISE || — || align=right | 3.7 km || 
|-id=582 bgcolor=#E9E9E9
| 477582 ||  || — || March 16, 2005 || Mount Lemmon || Mount Lemmon Survey || — || align=right | 2.7 km || 
|-id=583 bgcolor=#E9E9E9
| 477583 ||  || — || May 3, 2010 || Kitt Peak || Spacewatch || — || align=right | 2.2 km || 
|-id=584 bgcolor=#E9E9E9
| 477584 ||  || — || May 4, 2010 || Kitt Peak || Spacewatch || MAR || align=right | 1.3 km || 
|-id=585 bgcolor=#E9E9E9
| 477585 ||  || — || May 7, 2010 || Kitt Peak || Spacewatch || — || align=right | 2.1 km || 
|-id=586 bgcolor=#E9E9E9
| 477586 ||  || — || February 9, 2010 || Catalina || CSS || — || align=right | 2.1 km || 
|-id=587 bgcolor=#B88A00
| 477587 ||  || — || May 11, 2010 || WISE || WISE || Tj (2.85) || align=right | 4.7 km || 
|-id=588 bgcolor=#FFC2E0
| 477588 ||  || — || May 7, 2010 || WISE || WISE || APO || align=right data-sort-value="0.69" | 690 m || 
|-id=589 bgcolor=#d6d6d6
| 477589 ||  || — || May 9, 2010 || WISE || WISE || — || align=right | 2.7 km || 
|-id=590 bgcolor=#d6d6d6
| 477590 ||  || — || May 11, 2010 || WISE || WISE || Tj (2.99) || align=right | 3.6 km || 
|-id=591 bgcolor=#d6d6d6
| 477591 ||  || — || May 11, 2010 || WISE || WISE || — || align=right | 4.1 km || 
|-id=592 bgcolor=#E9E9E9
| 477592 ||  || — || May 11, 2010 || Mount Lemmon || Mount Lemmon Survey || JUN || align=right | 1.1 km || 
|-id=593 bgcolor=#d6d6d6
| 477593 ||  || — || May 13, 2010 || WISE || WISE || Tj (2.97) || align=right | 3.5 km || 
|-id=594 bgcolor=#d6d6d6
| 477594 ||  || — || May 15, 2010 || WISE || WISE || — || align=right | 3.8 km || 
|-id=595 bgcolor=#d6d6d6
| 477595 ||  || — || May 15, 2010 || WISE || WISE || — || align=right | 3.4 km || 
|-id=596 bgcolor=#E9E9E9
| 477596 ||  || — || April 8, 2010 || Kitt Peak || Spacewatch || — || align=right | 1.3 km || 
|-id=597 bgcolor=#E9E9E9
| 477597 ||  || — || May 26, 2006 || Mount Lemmon || Mount Lemmon Survey || — || align=right | 1.9 km || 
|-id=598 bgcolor=#E9E9E9
| 477598 ||  || — || February 15, 2010 || Mount Lemmon || Mount Lemmon Survey || — || align=right | 1.4 km || 
|-id=599 bgcolor=#FA8072
| 477599 ||  || — || May 18, 2010 || Siding Spring || SSS || — || align=right data-sort-value="0.75" | 750 m || 
|-id=600 bgcolor=#d6d6d6
| 477600 ||  || — || May 17, 2010 || WISE || WISE || — || align=right | 2.8 km || 
|}

477601–477700 

|-bgcolor=#d6d6d6
| 477601 ||  || — || May 17, 2010 || WISE || WISE || — || align=right | 3.4 km || 
|-id=602 bgcolor=#E9E9E9
| 477602 ||  || — || February 17, 2010 || Kitt Peak || Spacewatch || — || align=right | 1.4 km || 
|-id=603 bgcolor=#d6d6d6
| 477603 ||  || — || May 21, 2010 || WISE || WISE || — || align=right | 4.4 km || 
|-id=604 bgcolor=#d6d6d6
| 477604 ||  || — || May 23, 2010 || WISE || WISE || — || align=right | 2.6 km || 
|-id=605 bgcolor=#d6d6d6
| 477605 ||  || — || May 23, 2010 || WISE || WISE || — || align=right | 3.3 km || 
|-id=606 bgcolor=#d6d6d6
| 477606 ||  || — || May 26, 2010 || WISE || WISE || — || align=right | 4.6 km || 
|-id=607 bgcolor=#d6d6d6
| 477607 ||  || — || January 14, 2001 || Kitt Peak || Spacewatch || — || align=right | 5.4 km || 
|-id=608 bgcolor=#d6d6d6
| 477608 ||  || — || May 29, 2010 || WISE || WISE || — || align=right | 2.1 km || 
|-id=609 bgcolor=#d6d6d6
| 477609 ||  || — || May 29, 2010 || WISE || WISE || — || align=right | 3.9 km || 
|-id=610 bgcolor=#d6d6d6
| 477610 ||  || — || October 1, 2005 || Kitt Peak || Spacewatch || — || align=right | 2.1 km || 
|-id=611 bgcolor=#d6d6d6
| 477611 ||  || — || May 30, 2010 || WISE || WISE || — || align=right | 3.2 km || 
|-id=612 bgcolor=#d6d6d6
| 477612 ||  || — || May 31, 2010 || WISE || WISE || — || align=right | 3.7 km || 
|-id=613 bgcolor=#d6d6d6
| 477613 ||  || — || May 31, 2010 || WISE || WISE || Tj (2.99) || align=right | 4.8 km || 
|-id=614 bgcolor=#d6d6d6
| 477614 ||  || — || May 31, 2010 || WISE || WISE || — || align=right | 4.4 km || 
|-id=615 bgcolor=#d6d6d6
| 477615 ||  || — || May 31, 2010 || WISE || WISE || — || align=right | 3.8 km || 
|-id=616 bgcolor=#d6d6d6
| 477616 ||  || — || June 1, 2010 || WISE || WISE || critical || align=right | 2.5 km || 
|-id=617 bgcolor=#d6d6d6
| 477617 ||  || — || June 1, 2010 || WISE || WISE || — || align=right | 5.0 km || 
|-id=618 bgcolor=#d6d6d6
| 477618 ||  || — || June 2, 2010 || WISE || WISE || — || align=right | 4.8 km || 
|-id=619 bgcolor=#d6d6d6
| 477619 ||  || — || June 6, 2010 || WISE || WISE || — || align=right | 4.0 km || 
|-id=620 bgcolor=#fefefe
| 477620 ||  || — || June 1, 2010 || Kitt Peak || Spacewatch || H || align=right data-sort-value="0.57" | 570 m || 
|-id=621 bgcolor=#d6d6d6
| 477621 ||  || — || June 6, 2010 || WISE || WISE || — || align=right | 2.4 km || 
|-id=622 bgcolor=#d6d6d6
| 477622 ||  || — || June 8, 2010 || WISE || WISE || THM || align=right | 2.4 km || 
|-id=623 bgcolor=#d6d6d6
| 477623 ||  || — || June 9, 2010 || WISE || WISE || — || align=right | 2.1 km || 
|-id=624 bgcolor=#d6d6d6
| 477624 ||  || — || June 9, 2010 || WISE || WISE || — || align=right | 2.6 km || 
|-id=625 bgcolor=#d6d6d6
| 477625 ||  || — || June 9, 2010 || WISE || WISE || — || align=right | 2.8 km || 
|-id=626 bgcolor=#d6d6d6
| 477626 ||  || — || June 13, 2010 || Kitt Peak || Spacewatch || — || align=right | 4.9 km || 
|-id=627 bgcolor=#d6d6d6
| 477627 ||  || — || June 9, 2010 || WISE || WISE || — || align=right | 3.6 km || 
|-id=628 bgcolor=#d6d6d6
| 477628 ||  || — || June 10, 2010 || WISE || WISE || — || align=right | 4.9 km || 
|-id=629 bgcolor=#d6d6d6
| 477629 ||  || — || June 12, 2010 || WISE || WISE || — || align=right | 3.4 km || 
|-id=630 bgcolor=#d6d6d6
| 477630 ||  || — || June 13, 2010 || WISE || WISE || — || align=right | 3.6 km || 
|-id=631 bgcolor=#d6d6d6
| 477631 ||  || — || June 13, 2010 || WISE || WISE || — || align=right | 3.7 km || 
|-id=632 bgcolor=#d6d6d6
| 477632 ||  || — || April 25, 2010 || WISE || WISE || — || align=right | 4.2 km || 
|-id=633 bgcolor=#d6d6d6
| 477633 ||  || — || June 14, 2010 || WISE || WISE || — || align=right | 3.3 km || 
|-id=634 bgcolor=#d6d6d6
| 477634 ||  || — || December 13, 2006 || Mount Lemmon || Mount Lemmon Survey || EOS || align=right | 2.4 km || 
|-id=635 bgcolor=#d6d6d6
| 477635 ||  || — || June 18, 2010 || Kitt Peak || Spacewatch || — || align=right | 4.0 km || 
|-id=636 bgcolor=#d6d6d6
| 477636 ||  || — || June 16, 2010 || WISE || WISE || — || align=right | 4.5 km || 
|-id=637 bgcolor=#d6d6d6
| 477637 ||  || — || June 18, 2010 || WISE || WISE || — || align=right | 4.3 km || 
|-id=638 bgcolor=#d6d6d6
| 477638 ||  || — || December 1, 2005 || Kitt Peak || Spacewatch || — || align=right | 2.6 km || 
|-id=639 bgcolor=#d6d6d6
| 477639 ||  || — || June 21, 2010 || WISE || WISE || Tj (2.99) || align=right | 3.6 km || 
|-id=640 bgcolor=#d6d6d6
| 477640 ||  || — || June 22, 2010 || WISE || WISE || — || align=right | 4.2 km || 
|-id=641 bgcolor=#d6d6d6
| 477641 ||  || — || June 24, 2010 || WISE || WISE || LIX || align=right | 2.9 km || 
|-id=642 bgcolor=#d6d6d6
| 477642 ||  || — || June 25, 2010 || WISE || WISE || — || align=right | 5.6 km || 
|-id=643 bgcolor=#d6d6d6
| 477643 ||  || — || June 26, 2010 || WISE || WISE || — || align=right | 3.0 km || 
|-id=644 bgcolor=#d6d6d6
| 477644 ||  || — || June 26, 2010 || WISE || WISE || — || align=right | 2.3 km || 
|-id=645 bgcolor=#E9E9E9
| 477645 ||  || — || June 27, 2010 || WISE || WISE || — || align=right | 2.1 km || 
|-id=646 bgcolor=#d6d6d6
| 477646 ||  || — || June 27, 2010 || WISE || WISE || 7:4 || align=right | 4.5 km || 
|-id=647 bgcolor=#d6d6d6
| 477647 ||  || — || December 7, 1999 || Kitt Peak || Spacewatch || — || align=right | 3.1 km || 
|-id=648 bgcolor=#d6d6d6
| 477648 ||  || — || June 28, 2010 || WISE || WISE || — || align=right | 2.0 km || 
|-id=649 bgcolor=#d6d6d6
| 477649 ||  || — || June 29, 2010 || WISE || WISE || — || align=right | 4.2 km || 
|-id=650 bgcolor=#d6d6d6
| 477650 ||  || — || June 30, 2010 || WISE || WISE || — || align=right | 3.9 km || 
|-id=651 bgcolor=#d6d6d6
| 477651 ||  || — || July 7, 2010 || WISE || WISE || — || align=right | 3.7 km || 
|-id=652 bgcolor=#E9E9E9
| 477652 ||  || — || January 21, 2010 || WISE || WISE || — || align=right | 3.1 km || 
|-id=653 bgcolor=#d6d6d6
| 477653 ||  || — || July 9, 2010 || WISE || WISE || fast? || align=right | 2.7 km || 
|-id=654 bgcolor=#d6d6d6
| 477654 ||  || — || July 9, 2010 || WISE || WISE || THM || align=right | 3.8 km || 
|-id=655 bgcolor=#d6d6d6
| 477655 ||  || — || July 11, 2010 || WISE || WISE || — || align=right | 4.4 km || 
|-id=656 bgcolor=#d6d6d6
| 477656 ||  || — || July 11, 2010 || WISE || WISE || VER || align=right | 3.1 km || 
|-id=657 bgcolor=#d6d6d6
| 477657 ||  || — || July 14, 2010 || WISE || WISE || — || align=right | 4.0 km || 
|-id=658 bgcolor=#d6d6d6
| 477658 ||  || — || July 14, 2010 || WISE || WISE || — || align=right | 4.0 km || 
|-id=659 bgcolor=#d6d6d6
| 477659 ||  || — || July 1, 2010 || WISE || WISE || — || align=right | 3.6 km || 
|-id=660 bgcolor=#d6d6d6
| 477660 ||  || — || April 6, 2008 || Kitt Peak || Spacewatch || — || align=right | 5.0 km || 
|-id=661 bgcolor=#d6d6d6
| 477661 ||  || — || July 12, 2010 || WISE || WISE || — || align=right | 3.1 km || 
|-id=662 bgcolor=#d6d6d6
| 477662 ||  || — || July 12, 2010 || WISE || WISE || — || align=right | 3.8 km || 
|-id=663 bgcolor=#d6d6d6
| 477663 ||  || — || July 5, 2010 || Kitt Peak || Spacewatch || — || align=right | 2.4 km || 
|-id=664 bgcolor=#d6d6d6
| 477664 ||  || — || July 16, 2010 || WISE || WISE || — || align=right | 3.4 km || 
|-id=665 bgcolor=#d6d6d6
| 477665 ||  || — || July 17, 2010 || WISE || WISE || — || align=right | 3.2 km || 
|-id=666 bgcolor=#d6d6d6
| 477666 ||  || — || July 17, 2010 || WISE || WISE || SYL7:4 || align=right | 4.6 km || 
|-id=667 bgcolor=#d6d6d6
| 477667 ||  || — || July 17, 2010 || WISE || WISE || — || align=right | 4.7 km || 
|-id=668 bgcolor=#d6d6d6
| 477668 ||  || — || July 21, 2010 || WISE || WISE || — || align=right | 4.1 km || 
|-id=669 bgcolor=#E9E9E9
| 477669 ||  || — || March 11, 2005 || Catalina || CSS || DOR || align=right | 2.2 km || 
|-id=670 bgcolor=#d6d6d6
| 477670 ||  || — || January 4, 2006 || Catalina || CSS || THB || align=right | 2.9 km || 
|-id=671 bgcolor=#d6d6d6
| 477671 ||  || — || July 26, 2010 || WISE || WISE || — || align=right | 2.9 km || 
|-id=672 bgcolor=#d6d6d6
| 477672 ||  || — || July 5, 2010 || Kitt Peak || Spacewatch || — || align=right | 3.0 km || 
|-id=673 bgcolor=#d6d6d6
| 477673 ||  || — || July 29, 2010 || WISE || WISE || — || align=right | 5.2 km || 
|-id=674 bgcolor=#E9E9E9
| 477674 ||  || — || January 30, 2010 || WISE || WISE || — || align=right | 2.3 km || 
|-id=675 bgcolor=#d6d6d6
| 477675 ||  || — || February 2, 2010 || WISE || WISE || — || align=right | 2.8 km || 
|-id=676 bgcolor=#d6d6d6
| 477676 ||  || — || August 7, 2010 || WISE || WISE || — || align=right | 3.8 km || 
|-id=677 bgcolor=#d6d6d6
| 477677 ||  || — || April 8, 2008 || Mount Lemmon || Mount Lemmon Survey || — || align=right | 2.5 km || 
|-id=678 bgcolor=#d6d6d6
| 477678 ||  || — || May 17, 2009 || Mount Lemmon || Mount Lemmon Survey || — || align=right | 2.7 km || 
|-id=679 bgcolor=#d6d6d6
| 477679 ||  || — || September 7, 1999 || Kitt Peak || Spacewatch || — || align=right | 3.7 km || 
|-id=680 bgcolor=#d6d6d6
| 477680 ||  || — || August 10, 2010 || Kitt Peak || Spacewatch || — || align=right | 2.5 km || 
|-id=681 bgcolor=#d6d6d6
| 477681 ||  || — || October 2, 2005 || Mount Lemmon || Mount Lemmon Survey || — || align=right | 2.0 km || 
|-id=682 bgcolor=#d6d6d6
| 477682 ||  || — || September 2, 2010 || Socorro || LINEAR || — || align=right | 3.6 km || 
|-id=683 bgcolor=#d6d6d6
| 477683 ||  || — || September 2, 2010 || Socorro || LINEAR || — || align=right | 2.9 km || 
|-id=684 bgcolor=#d6d6d6
| 477684 ||  || — || September 4, 2010 || Socorro || LINEAR || — || align=right | 3.1 km || 
|-id=685 bgcolor=#d6d6d6
| 477685 ||  || — || September 4, 2010 || Kitt Peak || Spacewatch || — || align=right | 2.7 km || 
|-id=686 bgcolor=#d6d6d6
| 477686 ||  || — || September 4, 2010 || Kitt Peak || Spacewatch || — || align=right | 3.0 km || 
|-id=687 bgcolor=#d6d6d6
| 477687 ||  || — || July 12, 2004 || Siding Spring || SSS || — || align=right | 3.2 km || 
|-id=688 bgcolor=#d6d6d6
| 477688 ||  || — || September 5, 2010 || Kitt Peak || Spacewatch || — || align=right | 2.4 km || 
|-id=689 bgcolor=#d6d6d6
| 477689 ||  || — || December 27, 2006 || Mount Lemmon || Mount Lemmon Survey || — || align=right | 2.9 km || 
|-id=690 bgcolor=#d6d6d6
| 477690 ||  || — || October 24, 2005 || Kitt Peak || Spacewatch || — || align=right | 2.4 km || 
|-id=691 bgcolor=#d6d6d6
| 477691 ||  || — || June 12, 2010 || WISE || WISE || URS || align=right | 4.7 km || 
|-id=692 bgcolor=#d6d6d6
| 477692 ||  || — || September 9, 2010 || Kitt Peak || Spacewatch || — || align=right | 2.8 km || 
|-id=693 bgcolor=#d6d6d6
| 477693 ||  || — || March 26, 2008 || Mount Lemmon || Mount Lemmon Survey || — || align=right | 3.3 km || 
|-id=694 bgcolor=#d6d6d6
| 477694 ||  || — || September 2, 2010 || Mount Lemmon || Mount Lemmon Survey || — || align=right | 2.4 km || 
|-id=695 bgcolor=#d6d6d6
| 477695 ||  || — || September 11, 2010 || Kitt Peak || Spacewatch || — || align=right | 3.0 km || 
|-id=696 bgcolor=#d6d6d6
| 477696 ||  || — || September 11, 2010 || Kitt Peak || Spacewatch || THM || align=right | 1.9 km || 
|-id=697 bgcolor=#d6d6d6
| 477697 ||  || — || May 27, 2008 || Kitt Peak || Spacewatch || — || align=right | 3.1 km || 
|-id=698 bgcolor=#d6d6d6
| 477698 ||  || — || September 11, 2010 || Kitt Peak || Spacewatch || — || align=right | 3.1 km || 
|-id=699 bgcolor=#d6d6d6
| 477699 ||  || — || September 11, 2010 || Kitt Peak || Spacewatch || 7:4 || align=right | 4.4 km || 
|-id=700 bgcolor=#d6d6d6
| 477700 ||  || — || March 6, 2008 || Mount Lemmon || Mount Lemmon Survey || — || align=right | 2.7 km || 
|}

477701–477800 

|-bgcolor=#d6d6d6
| 477701 ||  || — || November 28, 2005 || Socorro || LINEAR || — || align=right | 3.9 km || 
|-id=702 bgcolor=#d6d6d6
| 477702 ||  || — || September 13, 2010 || La Sagra || OAM Obs. || — || align=right | 3.0 km || 
|-id=703 bgcolor=#d6d6d6
| 477703 ||  || — || February 25, 2007 || Kitt Peak || Spacewatch || — || align=right | 2.7 km || 
|-id=704 bgcolor=#d6d6d6
| 477704 ||  || — || September 14, 2010 || Kitt Peak || Spacewatch || — || align=right | 2.7 km || 
|-id=705 bgcolor=#d6d6d6
| 477705 ||  || — || July 8, 2010 || WISE || WISE || LIX || align=right | 3.3 km || 
|-id=706 bgcolor=#d6d6d6
| 477706 ||  || — || September 14, 2010 || Kitt Peak || Spacewatch || — || align=right | 2.7 km || 
|-id=707 bgcolor=#d6d6d6
| 477707 ||  || — || September 15, 2010 || Kitt Peak || Spacewatch || — || align=right | 2.7 km || 
|-id=708 bgcolor=#d6d6d6
| 477708 ||  || — || September 15, 2010 || Kitt Peak || Spacewatch || — || align=right | 3.4 km || 
|-id=709 bgcolor=#d6d6d6
| 477709 ||  || — || October 8, 2005 || Catalina || CSS || — || align=right | 3.0 km || 
|-id=710 bgcolor=#d6d6d6
| 477710 ||  || — || September 11, 2010 || Kitt Peak || Spacewatch || — || align=right | 3.2 km || 
|-id=711 bgcolor=#d6d6d6
| 477711 ||  || — || September 1, 2010 || Mount Lemmon || Mount Lemmon Survey || — || align=right | 3.3 km || 
|-id=712 bgcolor=#d6d6d6
| 477712 ||  || — || September 3, 2010 || Mount Lemmon || Mount Lemmon Survey || — || align=right | 2.7 km || 
|-id=713 bgcolor=#d6d6d6
| 477713 ||  || — || September 10, 2010 || Kitt Peak || Spacewatch || HYG || align=right | 2.4 km || 
|-id=714 bgcolor=#d6d6d6
| 477714 ||  || — || September 16, 2010 || Mount Lemmon || Mount Lemmon Survey || — || align=right | 2.5 km || 
|-id=715 bgcolor=#fefefe
| 477715 ||  || — || September 16, 2010 || Mount Lemmon || Mount Lemmon Survey || critical || align=right data-sort-value="0.57" | 570 m || 
|-id=716 bgcolor=#d6d6d6
| 477716 ||  || — || February 6, 2007 || Mount Lemmon || Mount Lemmon Survey || — || align=right | 3.4 km || 
|-id=717 bgcolor=#d6d6d6
| 477717 ||  || — || September 16, 2010 || Kitt Peak || Spacewatch || — || align=right | 2.7 km || 
|-id=718 bgcolor=#d6d6d6
| 477718 ||  || — || March 1, 2008 || Kitt Peak || Spacewatch || — || align=right | 2.7 km || 
|-id=719 bgcolor=#FFC2E0
| 477719 ||  || — || September 29, 2010 || Mount Lemmon || Mount Lemmon Survey || AMOcritical || align=right data-sort-value="0.032" | 32 m || 
|-id=720 bgcolor=#d6d6d6
| 477720 ||  || — || September 17, 2010 || Kitt Peak || Spacewatch || Tj (2.99) || align=right | 2.6 km || 
|-id=721 bgcolor=#d6d6d6
| 477721 ||  || — || August 6, 2010 || Kitt Peak || Spacewatch || — || align=right | 3.0 km || 
|-id=722 bgcolor=#d6d6d6
| 477722 ||  || — || November 26, 2005 || Kitt Peak || Spacewatch || — || align=right | 2.2 km || 
|-id=723 bgcolor=#d6d6d6
| 477723 ||  || — || July 11, 2010 || WISE || WISE || — || align=right | 2.6 km || 
|-id=724 bgcolor=#d6d6d6
| 477724 ||  || — || September 29, 2010 || Mount Lemmon || Mount Lemmon Survey || — || align=right | 3.5 km || 
|-id=725 bgcolor=#d6d6d6
| 477725 ||  || — || September 17, 2010 || Mount Lemmon || Mount Lemmon Survey || — || align=right | 2.9 km || 
|-id=726 bgcolor=#d6d6d6
| 477726 ||  || — || September 29, 2010 || Mount Lemmon || Mount Lemmon Survey || — || align=right | 3.3 km || 
|-id=727 bgcolor=#d6d6d6
| 477727 ||  || — || November 30, 1999 || Kitt Peak || Spacewatch || — || align=right | 2.6 km || 
|-id=728 bgcolor=#d6d6d6
| 477728 ||  || — || September 15, 2010 || Kitt Peak || Spacewatch || — || align=right | 2.6 km || 
|-id=729 bgcolor=#d6d6d6
| 477729 ||  || — || September 19, 2010 || Kitt Peak || Spacewatch || — || align=right | 3.4 km || 
|-id=730 bgcolor=#d6d6d6
| 477730 ||  || — || October 2, 2010 || Kitt Peak || Spacewatch || VER || align=right | 2.5 km || 
|-id=731 bgcolor=#d6d6d6
| 477731 ||  || — || October 3, 2010 || Kitt Peak || Spacewatch || 7:4 || align=right | 3.7 km || 
|-id=732 bgcolor=#d6d6d6
| 477732 ||  || — || September 9, 2010 || Kitt Peak || Spacewatch || — || align=right | 2.8 km || 
|-id=733 bgcolor=#d6d6d6
| 477733 ||  || — || May 2, 2009 || Mount Lemmon || Mount Lemmon Survey || — || align=right | 2.6 km || 
|-id=734 bgcolor=#d6d6d6
| 477734 ||  || — || May 1, 2008 || Mount Lemmon || Mount Lemmon Survey || — || align=right | 2.2 km || 
|-id=735 bgcolor=#d6d6d6
| 477735 ||  || — || September 10, 2010 || Kitt Peak || Spacewatch || — || align=right | 2.5 km || 
|-id=736 bgcolor=#d6d6d6
| 477736 ||  || — || December 7, 2005 || Kitt Peak || Spacewatch || — || align=right | 2.2 km || 
|-id=737 bgcolor=#d6d6d6
| 477737 ||  || — || September 4, 2010 || Kitt Peak || Spacewatch || — || align=right | 2.9 km || 
|-id=738 bgcolor=#d6d6d6
| 477738 ||  || — || September 17, 2010 || Kitt Peak || Spacewatch || VER || align=right | 2.5 km || 
|-id=739 bgcolor=#d6d6d6
| 477739 ||  || — || November 6, 2005 || Kitt Peak || Spacewatch || — || align=right | 3.2 km || 
|-id=740 bgcolor=#d6d6d6
| 477740 ||  || — || October 11, 2010 || Mount Lemmon || Mount Lemmon Survey || Tj (2.95) || align=right | 4.1 km || 
|-id=741 bgcolor=#d6d6d6
| 477741 ||  || — || September 16, 2010 || Mount Lemmon || Mount Lemmon Survey || — || align=right | 2.7 km || 
|-id=742 bgcolor=#d6d6d6
| 477742 ||  || — || October 11, 2010 || Mount Lemmon || Mount Lemmon Survey || — || align=right | 3.5 km || 
|-id=743 bgcolor=#d6d6d6
| 477743 ||  || — || March 9, 2007 || Kitt Peak || Spacewatch || — || align=right | 2.5 km || 
|-id=744 bgcolor=#d6d6d6
| 477744 ||  || — || July 20, 2004 || Siding Spring || SSS || — || align=right | 4.1 km || 
|-id=745 bgcolor=#d6d6d6
| 477745 ||  || — || April 3, 2008 || Mount Lemmon || Mount Lemmon Survey || VER || align=right | 2.1 km || 
|-id=746 bgcolor=#d6d6d6
| 477746 ||  || — || March 16, 2007 || Mount Lemmon || Mount Lemmon Survey || — || align=right | 3.3 km || 
|-id=747 bgcolor=#d6d6d6
| 477747 ||  || — || May 11, 2002 || Socorro || LINEAR || — || align=right | 3.8 km || 
|-id=748 bgcolor=#d6d6d6
| 477748 ||  || — || November 3, 2010 || Mount Lemmon || Mount Lemmon Survey || — || align=right | 3.7 km || 
|-id=749 bgcolor=#d6d6d6
| 477749 ||  || — || September 18, 2010 || Mount Lemmon || Mount Lemmon Survey || — || align=right | 2.3 km || 
|-id=750 bgcolor=#d6d6d6
| 477750 ||  || — || July 28, 2010 || WISE || WISE || — || align=right | 3.6 km || 
|-id=751 bgcolor=#fefefe
| 477751 ||  || — || November 2, 2010 || Kitt Peak || Spacewatch || — || align=right data-sort-value="0.52" | 520 m || 
|-id=752 bgcolor=#d6d6d6
| 477752 ||  || — || December 27, 2005 || Kitt Peak || Spacewatch || critical || align=right | 2.1 km || 
|-id=753 bgcolor=#d6d6d6
| 477753 ||  || — || February 15, 2001 || Socorro || LINEAR || — || align=right | 3.8 km || 
|-id=754 bgcolor=#d6d6d6
| 477754 ||  || — || September 12, 2004 || Kitt Peak || Spacewatch || — || align=right | 2.7 km || 
|-id=755 bgcolor=#d6d6d6
| 477755 ||  || — || September 17, 2010 || Mount Lemmon || Mount Lemmon Survey || — || align=right | 3.1 km || 
|-id=756 bgcolor=#fefefe
| 477756 ||  || — || November 6, 2010 || Kitt Peak || Spacewatch || — || align=right data-sort-value="0.52" | 520 m || 
|-id=757 bgcolor=#fefefe
| 477757 ||  || — || November 10, 2010 || Kitt Peak || Spacewatch || — || align=right data-sort-value="0.61" | 610 m || 
|-id=758 bgcolor=#fefefe
| 477758 ||  || — || November 7, 2007 || Mount Lemmon || Mount Lemmon Survey || — || align=right data-sort-value="0.67" | 670 m || 
|-id=759 bgcolor=#fefefe
| 477759 ||  || — || November 3, 2010 || Kitt Peak || Spacewatch || — || align=right data-sort-value="0.53" | 530 m || 
|-id=760 bgcolor=#d6d6d6
| 477760 ||  || — || November 1, 2010 || Mount Lemmon || Mount Lemmon Survey || — || align=right | 2.7 km || 
|-id=761 bgcolor=#d6d6d6
| 477761 ||  || — || November 8, 2010 || Mount Lemmon || Mount Lemmon Survey || — || align=right | 3.5 km || 
|-id=762 bgcolor=#FFC2E0
| 477762 ||  || — || December 6, 2010 || Catalina || CSS || AMO || align=right data-sort-value="0.33" | 330 m || 
|-id=763 bgcolor=#d6d6d6
| 477763 ||  || — || November 5, 2010 || Mount Lemmon || Mount Lemmon Survey || — || align=right | 3.9 km || 
|-id=764 bgcolor=#fefefe
| 477764 ||  || — || February 2, 2008 || Kitt Peak || Spacewatch || — || align=right data-sort-value="0.54" | 540 m || 
|-id=765 bgcolor=#fefefe
| 477765 ||  || — || January 11, 2008 || Mount Lemmon || Mount Lemmon Survey || — || align=right data-sort-value="0.68" | 680 m || 
|-id=766 bgcolor=#d6d6d6
| 477766 ||  || — || November 15, 2010 || Mount Lemmon || Mount Lemmon Survey || — || align=right | 3.2 km || 
|-id=767 bgcolor=#fefefe
| 477767 ||  || — || January 10, 2011 || Kitt Peak || Spacewatch || V || align=right data-sort-value="0.55" | 550 m || 
|-id=768 bgcolor=#fefefe
| 477768 ||  || — || January 8, 2011 || Mount Lemmon || Mount Lemmon Survey || — || align=right data-sort-value="0.55" | 550 m || 
|-id=769 bgcolor=#fefefe
| 477769 ||  || — || January 10, 2011 || Mount Lemmon || Mount Lemmon Survey || — || align=right data-sort-value="0.49" | 490 m || 
|-id=770 bgcolor=#fefefe
| 477770 ||  || — || January 3, 2011 || Mount Lemmon || Mount Lemmon Survey || — || align=right data-sort-value="0.73" | 730 m || 
|-id=771 bgcolor=#fefefe
| 477771 ||  || — || December 22, 2003 || Kitt Peak || Spacewatch || — || align=right data-sort-value="0.59" | 590 m || 
|-id=772 bgcolor=#fefefe
| 477772 ||  || — || September 16, 2009 || Mount Lemmon || Mount Lemmon Survey || V || align=right data-sort-value="0.65" | 650 m || 
|-id=773 bgcolor=#fefefe
| 477773 ||  || — || December 8, 2010 || Mount Lemmon || Mount Lemmon Survey || — || align=right data-sort-value="0.59" | 590 m || 
|-id=774 bgcolor=#fefefe
| 477774 ||  || — || December 9, 2010 || Mount Lemmon || Mount Lemmon Survey || — || align=right data-sort-value="0.56" | 560 m || 
|-id=775 bgcolor=#fefefe
| 477775 ||  || — || February 10, 2008 || Kitt Peak || Spacewatch || — || align=right data-sort-value="0.58" | 580 m || 
|-id=776 bgcolor=#fefefe
| 477776 ||  || — || April 7, 2008 || Kitt Peak || Spacewatch || — || align=right data-sort-value="0.71" | 710 m || 
|-id=777 bgcolor=#fefefe
| 477777 ||  || — || February 7, 2008 || Kitt Peak || Spacewatch || — || align=right data-sort-value="0.52" | 520 m || 
|-id=778 bgcolor=#fefefe
| 477778 ||  || — || November 24, 2003 || Kitt Peak || Spacewatch || — || align=right data-sort-value="0.63" | 630 m || 
|-id=779 bgcolor=#fefefe
| 477779 ||  || — || November 15, 2010 || Mount Lemmon || Mount Lemmon Survey || — || align=right data-sort-value="0.72" | 720 m || 
|-id=780 bgcolor=#fefefe
| 477780 ||  || — || January 14, 2011 || Kitt Peak || Spacewatch || — || align=right data-sort-value="0.71" | 710 m || 
|-id=781 bgcolor=#fefefe
| 477781 ||  || — || February 10, 2008 || Mount Lemmon || Mount Lemmon Survey || — || align=right data-sort-value="0.65" | 650 m || 
|-id=782 bgcolor=#d6d6d6
| 477782 ||  || — || February 4, 1995 || Kitt Peak || Spacewatch || SHU3:2 || align=right | 4.6 km || 
|-id=783 bgcolor=#fefefe
| 477783 ||  || — || October 3, 2003 || Kitt Peak || Spacewatch || — || align=right data-sort-value="0.70" | 700 m || 
|-id=784 bgcolor=#fefefe
| 477784 ||  || — || November 14, 2006 || Mount Lemmon || Mount Lemmon Survey || — || align=right data-sort-value="0.74" | 740 m || 
|-id=785 bgcolor=#fefefe
| 477785 ||  || — || September 28, 2009 || Kitt Peak || Spacewatch || V || align=right data-sort-value="0.58" | 580 m || 
|-id=786 bgcolor=#fefefe
| 477786 ||  || — || January 12, 2011 || Kitt Peak || Spacewatch || — || align=right data-sort-value="0.79" | 790 m || 
|-id=787 bgcolor=#d6d6d6
| 477787 ||  || — || November 20, 2009 || Kitt Peak || Spacewatch || 3:2 || align=right | 3.5 km || 
|-id=788 bgcolor=#fefefe
| 477788 ||  || — || January 28, 2011 || Kitt Peak || Spacewatch || — || align=right data-sort-value="0.85" | 850 m || 
|-id=789 bgcolor=#fefefe
| 477789 ||  || — || January 5, 2011 || Mount Lemmon || Mount Lemmon Survey || NYS || align=right data-sort-value="0.59" | 590 m || 
|-id=790 bgcolor=#fefefe
| 477790 ||  || — || January 28, 2011 || Mount Lemmon || Mount Lemmon Survey || — || align=right data-sort-value="0.57" | 570 m || 
|-id=791 bgcolor=#fefefe
| 477791 ||  || — || January 27, 2011 || Kitt Peak || Spacewatch || — || align=right data-sort-value="0.98" | 980 m || 
|-id=792 bgcolor=#fefefe
| 477792 ||  || — || January 28, 2011 || Kitt Peak || Spacewatch || V || align=right data-sort-value="0.49" | 490 m || 
|-id=793 bgcolor=#fefefe
| 477793 ||  || — || October 4, 2006 || Mount Lemmon || Mount Lemmon Survey || — || align=right data-sort-value="0.58" | 580 m || 
|-id=794 bgcolor=#fefefe
| 477794 ||  || — || October 22, 2006 || Catalina || CSS || — || align=right data-sort-value="0.62" | 620 m || 
|-id=795 bgcolor=#d6d6d6
| 477795 ||  || — || January 23, 2011 || Mount Lemmon || Mount Lemmon Survey || 3:2 || align=right | 4.0 km || 
|-id=796 bgcolor=#FA8072
| 477796 ||  || — || November 19, 2006 || Kitt Peak || Spacewatch || — || align=right | 1.1 km || 
|-id=797 bgcolor=#fefefe
| 477797 ||  || — || November 14, 2006 || Mount Lemmon || Mount Lemmon Survey || — || align=right data-sort-value="0.68" | 680 m || 
|-id=798 bgcolor=#fefefe
| 477798 ||  || — || September 16, 2009 || Mount Lemmon || Mount Lemmon Survey || — || align=right data-sort-value="0.75" | 750 m || 
|-id=799 bgcolor=#fefefe
| 477799 ||  || — || March 28, 2008 || Mount Lemmon || Mount Lemmon Survey || — || align=right data-sort-value="0.62" | 620 m || 
|-id=800 bgcolor=#fefefe
| 477800 ||  || — || November 23, 2006 || Mount Lemmon || Mount Lemmon Survey || — || align=right data-sort-value="0.76" | 760 m || 
|}

477801–477900 

|-bgcolor=#fefefe
| 477801 ||  || — || October 20, 2006 || Kitt Peak || Spacewatch || — || align=right data-sort-value="0.59" | 590 m || 
|-id=802 bgcolor=#fefefe
| 477802 ||  || — || January 24, 2007 || Mount Lemmon || Mount Lemmon Survey || — || align=right data-sort-value="0.81" | 810 m || 
|-id=803 bgcolor=#d6d6d6
| 477803 ||  || — || September 3, 2008 || Kitt Peak || Spacewatch || 3:2 || align=right | 4.5 km || 
|-id=804 bgcolor=#fefefe
| 477804 ||  || — || February 3, 2000 || Kitt Peak || Spacewatch || — || align=right data-sort-value="0.79" | 790 m || 
|-id=805 bgcolor=#fefefe
| 477805 ||  || — || July 1, 2008 || Kitt Peak || Spacewatch || NYS || align=right data-sort-value="0.48" | 480 m || 
|-id=806 bgcolor=#fefefe
| 477806 ||  || — || November 19, 2006 || Kitt Peak || Spacewatch || — || align=right | 1.1 km || 
|-id=807 bgcolor=#fefefe
| 477807 ||  || — || March 14, 2004 || Socorro || LINEAR || — || align=right | 1.3 km || 
|-id=808 bgcolor=#fefefe
| 477808 ||  || — || March 16, 2004 || Campo Imperatore || CINEOS || — || align=right data-sort-value="0.66" | 660 m || 
|-id=809 bgcolor=#fefefe
| 477809 ||  || — || March 20, 2004 || Kitt Peak || Spacewatch || — || align=right data-sort-value="0.76" | 760 m || 
|-id=810 bgcolor=#fefefe
| 477810 ||  || — || December 9, 2006 || Kitt Peak || Spacewatch || — || align=right data-sort-value="0.59" | 590 m || 
|-id=811 bgcolor=#fefefe
| 477811 ||  || — || September 17, 2009 || Mount Lemmon || Mount Lemmon Survey || — || align=right data-sort-value="0.80" | 800 m || 
|-id=812 bgcolor=#fefefe
| 477812 ||  || — || January 11, 2011 || Mount Lemmon || Mount Lemmon Survey || — || align=right data-sort-value="0.98" | 980 m || 
|-id=813 bgcolor=#fefefe
| 477813 ||  || — || October 15, 2009 || Mount Lemmon || Mount Lemmon Survey || — || align=right data-sort-value="0.82" | 820 m || 
|-id=814 bgcolor=#fefefe
| 477814 ||  || — || September 29, 2009 || Kitt Peak || Spacewatch || — || align=right data-sort-value="0.83" | 830 m || 
|-id=815 bgcolor=#E9E9E9
| 477815 ||  || — || March 2, 2011 || Kitt Peak || Spacewatch || — || align=right data-sort-value="0.79" | 790 m || 
|-id=816 bgcolor=#d6d6d6
| 477816 ||  || — || November 9, 2009 || Kitt Peak || Spacewatch || 3:2 || align=right | 4.6 km || 
|-id=817 bgcolor=#fefefe
| 477817 ||  || — || April 24, 2004 || Kitt Peak || Spacewatch || — || align=right data-sort-value="0.86" | 860 m || 
|-id=818 bgcolor=#fefefe
| 477818 ||  || — || February 23, 2011 || Kitt Peak || Spacewatch || — || align=right data-sort-value="0.68" | 680 m || 
|-id=819 bgcolor=#fefefe
| 477819 ||  || — || February 25, 2011 || Mount Lemmon || Mount Lemmon Survey || — || align=right data-sort-value="0.77" | 770 m || 
|-id=820 bgcolor=#fefefe
| 477820 ||  || — || October 21, 2009 || Mount Lemmon || Mount Lemmon Survey || — || align=right data-sort-value="0.82" | 820 m || 
|-id=821 bgcolor=#fefefe
| 477821 ||  || — || August 28, 2005 || Kitt Peak || Spacewatch || — || align=right data-sort-value="0.87" | 870 m || 
|-id=822 bgcolor=#fefefe
| 477822 ||  || — || August 20, 2009 || Kitt Peak || Spacewatch || (2076) || align=right data-sort-value="0.69" | 690 m || 
|-id=823 bgcolor=#fefefe
| 477823 ||  || — || February 25, 2011 || Kitt Peak || Spacewatch || V || align=right data-sort-value="0.78" | 780 m || 
|-id=824 bgcolor=#fefefe
| 477824 ||  || — || February 25, 2011 || Kitt Peak || Spacewatch || — || align=right data-sort-value="0.97" | 970 m || 
|-id=825 bgcolor=#fefefe
| 477825 ||  || — || November 19, 2006 || Catalina || CSS || — || align=right data-sort-value="0.83" | 830 m || 
|-id=826 bgcolor=#FA8072
| 477826 ||  || — || August 4, 2003 || Socorro || LINEAR || — || align=right | 1.7 km || 
|-id=827 bgcolor=#E9E9E9
| 477827 ||  || — || January 11, 2011 || Mount Lemmon || Mount Lemmon Survey || — || align=right | 1.7 km || 
|-id=828 bgcolor=#E9E9E9
| 477828 ||  || — || March 5, 2011 || Catalina || CSS || — || align=right | 1.1 km || 
|-id=829 bgcolor=#fefefe
| 477829 ||  || — || March 18, 2004 || Socorro || LINEAR || — || align=right data-sort-value="0.81" | 810 m || 
|-id=830 bgcolor=#fefefe
| 477830 ||  || — || December 8, 1999 || Kitt Peak || Spacewatch || — || align=right data-sort-value="0.75" | 750 m || 
|-id=831 bgcolor=#fefefe
| 477831 ||  || — || November 4, 2002 || Kitt Peak || Spacewatch || V || align=right data-sort-value="0.65" | 650 m || 
|-id=832 bgcolor=#fefefe
| 477832 ||  || — || September 27, 2009 || Kitt Peak || Spacewatch || — || align=right data-sort-value="0.76" | 760 m || 
|-id=833 bgcolor=#fefefe
| 477833 ||  || — || December 12, 2006 || Kitt Peak || Spacewatch || — || align=right data-sort-value="0.85" | 850 m || 
|-id=834 bgcolor=#fefefe
| 477834 ||  || — || March 13, 2007 || Mount Lemmon || Mount Lemmon Survey || — || align=right data-sort-value="0.87" | 870 m || 
|-id=835 bgcolor=#fefefe
| 477835 ||  || — || December 16, 2006 || Kitt Peak || Spacewatch || — || align=right data-sort-value="0.87" | 870 m || 
|-id=836 bgcolor=#fefefe
| 477836 ||  || — || September 28, 2009 || Kitt Peak || Spacewatch || — || align=right data-sort-value="0.77" | 770 m || 
|-id=837 bgcolor=#E9E9E9
| 477837 ||  || — || March 9, 2011 || Kitt Peak || Spacewatch || — || align=right | 1.1 km || 
|-id=838 bgcolor=#fefefe
| 477838 ||  || — || November 19, 2009 || Mount Lemmon || Mount Lemmon Survey || — || align=right data-sort-value="0.87" | 870 m || 
|-id=839 bgcolor=#fefefe
| 477839 ||  || — || October 12, 2005 || Kitt Peak || Spacewatch || — || align=right data-sort-value="0.89" | 890 m || 
|-id=840 bgcolor=#fefefe
| 477840 ||  || — || January 26, 2007 || Kitt Peak || Spacewatch || — || align=right data-sort-value="0.66" | 660 m || 
|-id=841 bgcolor=#fefefe
| 477841 ||  || — || November 27, 2006 || Mount Lemmon || Mount Lemmon Survey || — || align=right data-sort-value="0.77" | 770 m || 
|-id=842 bgcolor=#fefefe
| 477842 ||  || — || January 16, 2007 || Catalina || CSS || — || align=right | 1.1 km || 
|-id=843 bgcolor=#fefefe
| 477843 ||  || — || February 9, 2007 || Catalina || CSS || — || align=right data-sort-value="0.90" | 900 m || 
|-id=844 bgcolor=#fefefe
| 477844 ||  || — || March 2, 2011 || Kitt Peak || Spacewatch || — || align=right data-sort-value="0.71" | 710 m || 
|-id=845 bgcolor=#fefefe
| 477845 ||  || — || March 29, 2004 || Kitt Peak || Spacewatch || — || align=right data-sort-value="0.62" | 620 m || 
|-id=846 bgcolor=#fefefe
| 477846 ||  || — || September 17, 2009 || Mount Lemmon || Mount Lemmon Survey || — || align=right data-sort-value="0.54" | 540 m || 
|-id=847 bgcolor=#E9E9E9
| 477847 ||  || — || March 16, 2007 || Catalina || CSS || — || align=right | 1.1 km || 
|-id=848 bgcolor=#fefefe
| 477848 ||  || — || September 30, 1999 || Kitt Peak || Spacewatch || — || align=right data-sort-value="0.64" | 640 m || 
|-id=849 bgcolor=#FA8072
| 477849 ||  || — || August 11, 2007 || Siding Spring || SSS || — || align=right data-sort-value="0.56" | 560 m || 
|-id=850 bgcolor=#fefefe
| 477850 ||  || — || February 8, 2011 || Mount Lemmon || Mount Lemmon Survey || — || align=right data-sort-value="0.90" | 900 m || 
|-id=851 bgcolor=#fefefe
| 477851 ||  || — || January 27, 2007 || Mount Lemmon || Mount Lemmon Survey || — || align=right data-sort-value="0.93" | 930 m || 
|-id=852 bgcolor=#E9E9E9
| 477852 ||  || — || March 13, 2011 || Kitt Peak || Spacewatch || — || align=right | 1.5 km || 
|-id=853 bgcolor=#fefefe
| 477853 ||  || — || April 14, 2004 || Kitt Peak || Spacewatch || — || align=right data-sort-value="0.75" | 750 m || 
|-id=854 bgcolor=#E9E9E9
| 477854 ||  || — || April 2, 2011 || Kitt Peak || Spacewatch || — || align=right | 1.4 km || 
|-id=855 bgcolor=#fefefe
| 477855 ||  || — || March 9, 2007 || Mount Lemmon || Mount Lemmon Survey || — || align=right data-sort-value="0.59" | 590 m || 
|-id=856 bgcolor=#E9E9E9
| 477856 ||  || — || October 9, 2008 || Mount Lemmon || Mount Lemmon Survey || RAF || align=right data-sort-value="0.68" | 680 m || 
|-id=857 bgcolor=#fefefe
| 477857 ||  || — || February 23, 2007 || Kitt Peak || Spacewatch || — || align=right data-sort-value="0.67" | 670 m || 
|-id=858 bgcolor=#E9E9E9
| 477858 ||  || — || March 14, 2011 || Catalina || CSS || — || align=right | 1.9 km || 
|-id=859 bgcolor=#E9E9E9
| 477859 ||  || — || April 1, 2011 || Kitt Peak || Spacewatch || KON || align=right | 1.8 km || 
|-id=860 bgcolor=#E9E9E9
| 477860 ||  || — || March 26, 2011 || Mount Lemmon || Mount Lemmon Survey || — || align=right data-sort-value="0.95" | 950 m || 
|-id=861 bgcolor=#fefefe
| 477861 ||  || — || January 24, 2011 || Kitt Peak || Spacewatch || — || align=right | 1.2 km || 
|-id=862 bgcolor=#fefefe
| 477862 ||  || — || April 12, 1997 || Kitt Peak || Spacewatch || — || align=right data-sort-value="0.82" | 820 m || 
|-id=863 bgcolor=#fefefe
| 477863 ||  || — || March 2, 2011 || Kitt Peak || Spacewatch || — || align=right data-sort-value="0.62" | 620 m || 
|-id=864 bgcolor=#fefefe
| 477864 ||  || — || December 24, 2005 || Kitt Peak || Spacewatch || — || align=right data-sort-value="0.90" | 900 m || 
|-id=865 bgcolor=#E9E9E9
| 477865 ||  || — || April 24, 2011 || Mount Lemmon || Mount Lemmon Survey || — || align=right data-sort-value="0.98" | 980 m || 
|-id=866 bgcolor=#fefefe
| 477866 ||  || — || March 28, 2011 || Kitt Peak || Spacewatch || — || align=right data-sort-value="0.96" | 960 m || 
|-id=867 bgcolor=#E9E9E9
| 477867 ||  || — || April 27, 2011 || Kitt Peak || Spacewatch || — || align=right | 1.2 km || 
|-id=868 bgcolor=#fefefe
| 477868 ||  || — || March 14, 2007 || Mount Lemmon || Mount Lemmon Survey || — || align=right data-sort-value="0.97" | 970 m || 
|-id=869 bgcolor=#fefefe
| 477869 ||  || — || April 23, 2011 || Kitt Peak || Spacewatch || V || align=right data-sort-value="0.82" | 820 m || 
|-id=870 bgcolor=#E9E9E9
| 477870 ||  || — || April 27, 2011 || Kitt Peak || Spacewatch || — || align=right | 1.8 km || 
|-id=871 bgcolor=#E9E9E9
| 477871 ||  || — || April 11, 2011 || Mount Lemmon || Mount Lemmon Survey || — || align=right | 1.1 km || 
|-id=872 bgcolor=#E9E9E9
| 477872 ||  || — || April 1, 2010 || WISE || WISE || — || align=right | 2.7 km || 
|-id=873 bgcolor=#E9E9E9
| 477873 ||  || — || February 11, 2011 || Mount Lemmon || Mount Lemmon Survey || — || align=right | 1.4 km || 
|-id=874 bgcolor=#E9E9E9
| 477874 ||  || — || April 26, 2011 || Kitt Peak || Spacewatch || EUN || align=right | 1.1 km || 
|-id=875 bgcolor=#E9E9E9
| 477875 ||  || — || April 13, 2011 || Kitt Peak || Spacewatch || — || align=right | 1.0 km || 
|-id=876 bgcolor=#E9E9E9
| 477876 ||  || — || March 27, 2011 || Kitt Peak || Spacewatch || — || align=right data-sort-value="0.84" | 840 m || 
|-id=877 bgcolor=#E9E9E9
| 477877 ||  || — || April 22, 2011 || Kitt Peak || Spacewatch || ADE || align=right | 1.5 km || 
|-id=878 bgcolor=#fefefe
| 477878 ||  || — || December 21, 2006 || Mount Lemmon || Mount Lemmon Survey || — || align=right data-sort-value="0.73" | 730 m || 
|-id=879 bgcolor=#E9E9E9
| 477879 ||  || — || April 23, 1998 || Kitt Peak || Spacewatch || critical || align=right | 1.3 km || 
|-id=880 bgcolor=#E9E9E9
| 477880 ||  || — || April 23, 2011 || Kitt Peak || Spacewatch || — || align=right | 1.2 km || 
|-id=881 bgcolor=#E9E9E9
| 477881 ||  || — || April 30, 2011 || Kitt Peak || Spacewatch || RAF || align=right data-sort-value="0.73" | 730 m || 
|-id=882 bgcolor=#fefefe
| 477882 ||  || — || November 5, 2005 || Kitt Peak || Spacewatch || — || align=right data-sort-value="0.92" | 920 m || 
|-id=883 bgcolor=#fefefe
| 477883 ||  || — || July 30, 2008 || Mount Lemmon || Mount Lemmon Survey || V || align=right data-sort-value="0.73" | 730 m || 
|-id=884 bgcolor=#fefefe
| 477884 ||  || — || November 22, 2005 || Kitt Peak || Spacewatch || — || align=right data-sort-value="0.86" | 860 m || 
|-id=885 bgcolor=#FFC2E0
| 477885 ||  || — || April 6, 2011 || Catalina || CSS || AMO +1km || align=right | 1.3 km || 
|-id=886 bgcolor=#E9E9E9
| 477886 ||  || — || May 7, 2011 || Kitt Peak || Spacewatch || — || align=right | 1.4 km || 
|-id=887 bgcolor=#E9E9E9
| 477887 ||  || — || April 27, 2011 || Kitt Peak || Spacewatch || MAR || align=right data-sort-value="0.93" | 930 m || 
|-id=888 bgcolor=#E9E9E9
| 477888 ||  || — || April 30, 2011 || Kitt Peak || Spacewatch || — || align=right | 1.4 km || 
|-id=889 bgcolor=#fefefe
| 477889 ||  || — || May 7, 2011 || Kitt Peak || Spacewatch || V || align=right data-sort-value="0.59" | 590 m || 
|-id=890 bgcolor=#E9E9E9
| 477890 ||  || — || April 22, 2007 || Mount Lemmon || Mount Lemmon Survey || — || align=right data-sort-value="0.79" | 790 m || 
|-id=891 bgcolor=#E9E9E9
| 477891 ||  || — || April 22, 2011 || Kitt Peak || Spacewatch || ADE || align=right | 1.5 km || 
|-id=892 bgcolor=#E9E9E9
| 477892 ||  || — || January 7, 2010 || Mount Lemmon || Mount Lemmon Survey || JUN || align=right | 1.0 km || 
|-id=893 bgcolor=#E9E9E9
| 477893 ||  || — || April 23, 2011 || Kitt Peak || Spacewatch || — || align=right | 1.7 km || 
|-id=894 bgcolor=#E9E9E9
| 477894 ||  || — || April 5, 2011 || Mount Lemmon || Mount Lemmon Survey || — || align=right | 1.1 km || 
|-id=895 bgcolor=#E9E9E9
| 477895 ||  || — || May 5, 2011 || Mount Lemmon || Mount Lemmon Survey || — || align=right data-sort-value="0.98" | 980 m || 
|-id=896 bgcolor=#fefefe
| 477896 ||  || — || May 8, 2011 || Mount Lemmon || Mount Lemmon Survey || — || align=right data-sort-value="0.86" | 860 m || 
|-id=897 bgcolor=#E9E9E9
| 477897 ||  || — || April 30, 2011 || Mount Lemmon || Mount Lemmon Survey || — || align=right | 1.1 km || 
|-id=898 bgcolor=#E9E9E9
| 477898 ||  || — || December 18, 2009 || Mount Lemmon || Mount Lemmon Survey || — || align=right | 3.4 km || 
|-id=899 bgcolor=#E9E9E9
| 477899 ||  || — || May 8, 2011 || Catalina || CSS || — || align=right | 1.7 km || 
|-id=900 bgcolor=#E9E9E9
| 477900 ||  || — || April 4, 2010 || WISE || WISE || — || align=right | 4.0 km || 
|}

477901–478000 

|-bgcolor=#E9E9E9
| 477901 ||  || — || April 5, 2011 || Mount Lemmon || Mount Lemmon Survey || — || align=right data-sort-value="0.82" | 820 m || 
|-id=902 bgcolor=#fefefe
| 477902 ||  || — || October 31, 2005 || Kitt Peak || Spacewatch || — || align=right data-sort-value="0.98" | 980 m || 
|-id=903 bgcolor=#fefefe
| 477903 ||  || — || February 26, 2010 || WISE || WISE || — || align=right | 2.5 km || 
|-id=904 bgcolor=#E9E9E9
| 477904 ||  || — || May 22, 2011 || Mount Lemmon || Mount Lemmon Survey || — || align=right | 1.3 km || 
|-id=905 bgcolor=#E9E9E9
| 477905 ||  || — || May 22, 2011 || Mount Lemmon || Mount Lemmon Survey || — || align=right data-sort-value="0.90" | 900 m || 
|-id=906 bgcolor=#E9E9E9
| 477906 ||  || — || May 24, 2011 || Mount Lemmon || Mount Lemmon Survey || — || align=right | 1.4 km || 
|-id=907 bgcolor=#E9E9E9
| 477907 ||  || — || May 24, 2011 || Mount Lemmon || Mount Lemmon Survey || — || align=right | 1.6 km || 
|-id=908 bgcolor=#E9E9E9
| 477908 ||  || — || May 21, 2011 || Kitt Peak || Spacewatch || — || align=right data-sort-value="0.83" | 830 m || 
|-id=909 bgcolor=#E9E9E9
| 477909 ||  || — || May 5, 2011 || Mount Lemmon || Mount Lemmon Survey || — || align=right | 1.00 km || 
|-id=910 bgcolor=#fefefe
| 477910 ||  || — || March 12, 2007 || Kitt Peak || Spacewatch || — || align=right data-sort-value="0.72" | 720 m || 
|-id=911 bgcolor=#E9E9E9
| 477911 ||  || — || April 2, 2011 || Mount Lemmon || Mount Lemmon Survey || — || align=right | 1.7 km || 
|-id=912 bgcolor=#FA8072
| 477912 ||  || — || September 17, 2006 || Catalina || CSS || — || align=right | 1.7 km || 
|-id=913 bgcolor=#E9E9E9
| 477913 ||  || — || May 23, 2011 || Mount Lemmon || Mount Lemmon Survey || RAF || align=right data-sort-value="0.85" | 850 m || 
|-id=914 bgcolor=#E9E9E9
| 477914 ||  || — || December 1, 2008 || Kitt Peak || Spacewatch || — || align=right | 2.4 km || 
|-id=915 bgcolor=#E9E9E9
| 477915 ||  || — || May 3, 1994 || Kitt Peak || Spacewatch || (194) || align=right | 1.2 km || 
|-id=916 bgcolor=#d6d6d6
| 477916 ||  || — || July 1, 2011 || Mount Lemmon || Mount Lemmon Survey || — || align=right | 1.9 km || 
|-id=917 bgcolor=#E9E9E9
| 477917 ||  || — || July 2, 2011 || Siding Spring || SSS || — || align=right | 2.5 km || 
|-id=918 bgcolor=#d6d6d6
| 477918 ||  || — || January 27, 2003 || Socorro || LINEAR || — || align=right | 2.9 km || 
|-id=919 bgcolor=#d6d6d6
| 477919 ||  || — || August 27, 2006 || Kitt Peak || Spacewatch || — || align=right | 2.8 km || 
|-id=920 bgcolor=#E9E9E9
| 477920 ||  || — || August 6, 2002 || Campo Imperatore || CINEOS || — || align=right | 2.7 km || 
|-id=921 bgcolor=#E9E9E9
| 477921 ||  || — || January 18, 2009 || Kitt Peak || Spacewatch || — || align=right | 2.3 km || 
|-id=922 bgcolor=#E9E9E9
| 477922 ||  || — || April 20, 2006 || Kitt Peak || Spacewatch || — || align=right | 1.7 km || 
|-id=923 bgcolor=#d6d6d6
| 477923 ||  || — || February 20, 2009 || Kitt Peak || Spacewatch || — || align=right | 2.6 km || 
|-id=924 bgcolor=#d6d6d6
| 477924 ||  || — || January 16, 2009 || Kitt Peak || Spacewatch || — || align=right | 2.6 km || 
|-id=925 bgcolor=#d6d6d6
| 477925 ||  || — || August 21, 2006 || Kitt Peak || Spacewatch || — || align=right | 2.7 km || 
|-id=926 bgcolor=#E9E9E9
| 477926 ||  || — || October 20, 2007 || Mount Lemmon || Mount Lemmon Survey || HOF || align=right | 2.4 km || 
|-id=927 bgcolor=#fefefe
| 477927 ||  || — || September 20, 2006 || Catalina || CSS || H || align=right data-sort-value="0.85" | 850 m || 
|-id=928 bgcolor=#E9E9E9
| 477928 ||  || — || July 12, 2010 || WISE || WISE || — || align=right | 2.4 km || 
|-id=929 bgcolor=#E9E9E9
| 477929 ||  || — || November 9, 2007 || Mount Lemmon || Mount Lemmon Survey || — || align=right | 2.5 km || 
|-id=930 bgcolor=#d6d6d6
| 477930 ||  || — || October 20, 2006 || Kitt Peak || Spacewatch || EOS || align=right | 1.5 km || 
|-id=931 bgcolor=#E9E9E9
| 477931 ||  || — || December 22, 2008 || Kitt Peak || Spacewatch || GEF || align=right | 2.4 km || 
|-id=932 bgcolor=#E9E9E9
| 477932 ||  || — || January 30, 2009 || Kitt Peak || Spacewatch || — || align=right | 2.2 km || 
|-id=933 bgcolor=#E9E9E9
| 477933 ||  || — || December 21, 2008 || Mount Lemmon || Mount Lemmon Survey || — || align=right | 2.0 km || 
|-id=934 bgcolor=#d6d6d6
| 477934 ||  || — || September 26, 2000 || Anderson Mesa || LONEOS || — || align=right | 4.3 km || 
|-id=935 bgcolor=#d6d6d6
| 477935 ||  || — || October 17, 2001 || Kitt Peak || Spacewatch || — || align=right | 2.2 km || 
|-id=936 bgcolor=#E9E9E9
| 477936 ||  || — || January 30, 2004 || Kitt Peak || Spacewatch || AGN || align=right data-sort-value="0.95" | 950 m || 
|-id=937 bgcolor=#E9E9E9
| 477937 ||  || — || February 22, 2009 || Mount Lemmon || Mount Lemmon Survey || — || align=right | 2.3 km || 
|-id=938 bgcolor=#d6d6d6
| 477938 ||  || — || March 18, 2004 || Kitt Peak || Spacewatch || — || align=right | 2.7 km || 
|-id=939 bgcolor=#E9E9E9
| 477939 ||  || — || January 27, 2009 || XuYi || PMO NEO || — || align=right | 2.6 km || 
|-id=940 bgcolor=#d6d6d6
| 477940 ||  || — || November 14, 2001 || Kitt Peak || Spacewatch || — || align=right | 1.8 km || 
|-id=941 bgcolor=#d6d6d6
| 477941 ||  || — || August 27, 2006 || Kitt Peak || Spacewatch || KOR || align=right | 1.4 km || 
|-id=942 bgcolor=#E9E9E9
| 477942 ||  || — || February 1, 2009 || Kitt Peak || Spacewatch || — || align=right | 2.5 km || 
|-id=943 bgcolor=#d6d6d6
| 477943 ||  || — || January 1, 2008 || Kitt Peak || Spacewatch || — || align=right | 2.3 km || 
|-id=944 bgcolor=#E9E9E9
| 477944 ||  || — || December 17, 2007 || Mount Lemmon || Mount Lemmon Survey || DOR || align=right | 1.8 km || 
|-id=945 bgcolor=#d6d6d6
| 477945 ||  || — || December 31, 2007 || Kitt Peak || Spacewatch || — || align=right | 3.0 km || 
|-id=946 bgcolor=#d6d6d6
| 477946 ||  || — || May 4, 2005 || Mount Lemmon || Mount Lemmon Survey || — || align=right | 1.8 km || 
|-id=947 bgcolor=#E9E9E9
| 477947 ||  || — || February 1, 2009 || Kitt Peak || Spacewatch || HOF || align=right | 2.5 km || 
|-id=948 bgcolor=#d6d6d6
| 477948 ||  || — || August 28, 2011 || Siding Spring || SSS || — || align=right | 3.2 km || 
|-id=949 bgcolor=#d6d6d6
| 477949 ||  || — || September 7, 2011 || Kitt Peak || Spacewatch || KOR || align=right | 1.5 km || 
|-id=950 bgcolor=#d6d6d6
| 477950 ||  || — || November 14, 2006 || Catalina || CSS || — || align=right | 3.1 km || 
|-id=951 bgcolor=#E9E9E9
| 477951 ||  || — || September 14, 2006 || Kitt Peak || Spacewatch || — || align=right | 2.4 km || 
|-id=952 bgcolor=#E9E9E9
| 477952 ||  || — || March 3, 2009 || Mount Lemmon || Mount Lemmon Survey || — || align=right | 2.4 km || 
|-id=953 bgcolor=#E9E9E9
| 477953 ||  || — || October 10, 2007 || Mount Lemmon || Mount Lemmon Survey || — || align=right | 1.9 km || 
|-id=954 bgcolor=#E9E9E9
| 477954 ||  || — || March 10, 2005 || Anderson Mesa || LONEOS || — || align=right | 2.4 km || 
|-id=955 bgcolor=#d6d6d6
| 477955 ||  || — || October 15, 2006 || Kitt Peak || Spacewatch || EOS || align=right | 1.7 km || 
|-id=956 bgcolor=#d6d6d6
| 477956 ||  || — || September 8, 2011 || Kitt Peak || Spacewatch || — || align=right | 2.3 km || 
|-id=957 bgcolor=#d6d6d6
| 477957 ||  || — || August 29, 2006 || Kitt Peak || Spacewatch || KOR || align=right | 1.3 km || 
|-id=958 bgcolor=#E9E9E9
| 477958 ||  || — || April 2, 2005 || Mount Lemmon || Mount Lemmon Survey || — || align=right | 2.3 km || 
|-id=959 bgcolor=#d6d6d6
| 477959 ||  || — || December 17, 2007 || Mount Lemmon || Mount Lemmon Survey || — || align=right | 2.4 km || 
|-id=960 bgcolor=#d6d6d6
| 477960 ||  || — || August 28, 2006 || Kitt Peak || Spacewatch || KOR || align=right | 1.3 km || 
|-id=961 bgcolor=#d6d6d6
| 477961 ||  || — || September 18, 2011 || Mount Lemmon || Mount Lemmon Survey || THM || align=right | 2.1 km || 
|-id=962 bgcolor=#fefefe
| 477962 ||  || — || March 4, 2005 || Socorro || LINEAR || H || align=right data-sort-value="0.76" | 760 m || 
|-id=963 bgcolor=#d6d6d6
| 477963 ||  || — || September 20, 2011 || Kitt Peak || Spacewatch || VER || align=right | 2.7 km || 
|-id=964 bgcolor=#d6d6d6
| 477964 ||  || — || March 2, 2008 || Catalina || CSS || — || align=right | 4.2 km || 
|-id=965 bgcolor=#d6d6d6
| 477965 ||  || — || October 27, 2006 || Mount Lemmon || Mount Lemmon Survey || — || align=right | 2.3 km || 
|-id=966 bgcolor=#d6d6d6
| 477966 ||  || — || January 11, 2008 || Mount Lemmon || Mount Lemmon Survey || VER || align=right | 2.8 km || 
|-id=967 bgcolor=#d6d6d6
| 477967 ||  || — || October 18, 2006 || Kitt Peak || Spacewatch || critical || align=right | 2.0 km || 
|-id=968 bgcolor=#d6d6d6
| 477968 ||  || — || January 11, 2008 || Mount Lemmon || Mount Lemmon Survey || — || align=right | 3.9 km || 
|-id=969 bgcolor=#d6d6d6
| 477969 ||  || — || January 18, 2008 || Mount Lemmon || Mount Lemmon Survey || EOS || align=right | 1.6 km || 
|-id=970 bgcolor=#d6d6d6
| 477970 ||  || — || September 8, 2011 || Kitt Peak || Spacewatch || — || align=right | 2.5 km || 
|-id=971 bgcolor=#E9E9E9
| 477971 ||  || — || May 28, 2011 || Mount Lemmon || Mount Lemmon Survey || — || align=right | 1.7 km || 
|-id=972 bgcolor=#d6d6d6
| 477972 ||  || — || October 19, 2006 || Mount Lemmon || Mount Lemmon Survey || EOS || align=right | 2.2 km || 
|-id=973 bgcolor=#d6d6d6
| 477973 ||  || — || January 30, 2008 || Mount Lemmon || Mount Lemmon Survey || — || align=right | 2.7 km || 
|-id=974 bgcolor=#FA8072
| 477974 ||  || — || September 24, 2011 || Catalina || CSS || H || align=right data-sort-value="0.72" | 720 m || 
|-id=975 bgcolor=#d6d6d6
| 477975 ||  || — || August 28, 2006 || Kitt Peak || Spacewatch || — || align=right | 1.8 km || 
|-id=976 bgcolor=#d6d6d6
| 477976 ||  || — || August 21, 2006 || Kitt Peak || Spacewatch || — || align=right | 1.9 km || 
|-id=977 bgcolor=#d6d6d6
| 477977 ||  || — || July 1, 2011 || Mount Lemmon || Mount Lemmon Survey || — || align=right | 2.6 km || 
|-id=978 bgcolor=#d6d6d6
| 477978 ||  || — || September 21, 2011 || Kitt Peak || Spacewatch || — || align=right | 2.6 km || 
|-id=979 bgcolor=#fefefe
| 477979 ||  || — || May 6, 2005 || Mount Lemmon || Mount Lemmon Survey || H || align=right data-sort-value="0.75" | 750 m || 
|-id=980 bgcolor=#d6d6d6
| 477980 ||  || — || September 21, 2011 || Kitt Peak || Spacewatch || — || align=right | 2.1 km || 
|-id=981 bgcolor=#d6d6d6
| 477981 ||  || — || September 22, 2011 || Kitt Peak || Spacewatch || EOS || align=right | 2.2 km || 
|-id=982 bgcolor=#d6d6d6
| 477982 ||  || — || September 22, 2011 || Kitt Peak || Spacewatch || — || align=right | 2.7 km || 
|-id=983 bgcolor=#d6d6d6
| 477983 ||  || — || April 14, 2008 || Mount Lemmon || Mount Lemmon Survey || — || align=right | 2.8 km || 
|-id=984 bgcolor=#d6d6d6
| 477984 ||  || — || January 1, 2008 || Kitt Peak || Spacewatch || — || align=right | 1.8 km || 
|-id=985 bgcolor=#d6d6d6
| 477985 ||  || — || September 8, 2011 || Kitt Peak || Spacewatch || — || align=right | 2.3 km || 
|-id=986 bgcolor=#d6d6d6
| 477986 ||  || — || August 27, 2006 || Kitt Peak || Spacewatch || KOR || align=right | 1.2 km || 
|-id=987 bgcolor=#d6d6d6
| 477987 ||  || — || September 23, 2011 || Kitt Peak || Spacewatch || BRA || align=right | 1.3 km || 
|-id=988 bgcolor=#d6d6d6
| 477988 ||  || — || September 24, 2011 || Mount Lemmon || Mount Lemmon Survey || — || align=right | 3.0 km || 
|-id=989 bgcolor=#E9E9E9
| 477989 ||  || — || March 14, 2004 || Kitt Peak || Spacewatch || — || align=right | 2.0 km || 
|-id=990 bgcolor=#E9E9E9
| 477990 ||  || — || October 9, 2002 || Socorro || LINEAR || DOR || align=right | 2.4 km || 
|-id=991 bgcolor=#E9E9E9
| 477991 ||  || — || February 26, 2009 || Kitt Peak || Spacewatch || — || align=right | 2.4 km || 
|-id=992 bgcolor=#E9E9E9
| 477992 ||  || — || August 29, 2006 || Kitt Peak || Spacewatch || HOF || align=right | 2.4 km || 
|-id=993 bgcolor=#d6d6d6
| 477993 ||  || — || October 15, 1995 || Kitt Peak || Spacewatch || — || align=right | 2.1 km || 
|-id=994 bgcolor=#d6d6d6
| 477994 ||  || — || September 20, 2011 || Kitt Peak || Spacewatch || — || align=right | 2.5 km || 
|-id=995 bgcolor=#d6d6d6
| 477995 ||  || — || September 23, 2011 || Kitt Peak || Spacewatch || — || align=right | 3.5 km || 
|-id=996 bgcolor=#d6d6d6
| 477996 ||  || — || September 30, 2006 || Mount Lemmon || Mount Lemmon Survey || — || align=right | 2.3 km || 
|-id=997 bgcolor=#d6d6d6
| 477997 ||  || — || October 2, 2006 || Mount Lemmon || Mount Lemmon Survey || TEL || align=right | 1.0 km || 
|-id=998 bgcolor=#d6d6d6
| 477998 ||  || — || December 19, 2007 || Mount Lemmon || Mount Lemmon Survey || — || align=right | 3.4 km || 
|-id=999 bgcolor=#E9E9E9
| 477999 ||  || — || September 8, 2011 || Kitt Peak || Spacewatch || — || align=right | 2.2 km || 
|-id=000 bgcolor=#d6d6d6
| 478000 ||  || — || September 22, 1995 || Kitt Peak || Spacewatch || — || align=right | 1.6 km || 
|}

References

External links 
 Discovery Circumstances: Numbered Minor Planets (475001)–(480000) (IAU Minor Planet Center)

0477